= 2015 in paleomalacology =

This list, 2015 in molluscan paleontology, is a list of new taxa of ammonites and other fossil cephalopods, as well as fossil gastropods, bivalves and other molluscs that have been described during the year 2015.

== Ammonites ==
Name	Novelty	Status	Authors	Age	Unit	Location	Notes	Images
Abichites alibashiensis	Sp. nov	Valid	Korn & Ghaderi in Korn et al.	Late Permian (Changhsingian)		Iran		
Abichites ariaeii	Sp. nov	Valid	Korn & Ghaderi in Korn et al.	Late Permian (Changhsingian)		Iran		
Abichites paucinodus	Sp. nov	Valid	Korn & Ghaderi in Korn et al.	Late Permian (Changhsingian)		Iran		
Abichites shahriari	Sp. nov	Valid	Korn & Ghaderi in Korn et al.	Late Permian (Changhsingian)		Iran		
Abichites subtrapezoidalis	Sp. nov	Valid	Korn & Ghaderi in Korn et al.	Late Permian (Changhsingian)		Iran		
Abichites terminalis	Sp. nov	Valid	Korn & Ghaderi in Korn et al.	Late Permian (Changhsingian)		Iran		
Alibashites	Gen. et comb. et 3 sp. nov	Valid	Korn & Ghaderi in Korn et al.	Late Permian (Changhsingian)		Azerbaijan; Iran	A new genus for "Xenodiscus (Paratirolites)" mojsisovicsi Stoyanow (1910); genus also includes new species Alibashites ferdowsii and Alibashites uncinatus. New species A. stepanovi was also originally assigned to this genus, but subsequently it was transferred to the genus Lutites.	
Aspenites radiatus	Sp. nov	Valid	Smyshlyaeva & Zakharov	Early Triassic		Russia	A member of Aspenitidae, a species of Aspenites.	
Barremites macroumbilicus	Sp. nov	Valid	Matsukawa & Obata	Early Cretaceous		Japan	A species of Barremites.	
Boughdiriella	Gen. et sp. nov	Valid	Frau, Bulot & Wimbledon	Late Jurassic (late Tithonian)		Bulgaria; France; Spain	A himalayitid perisphinctoid. The type species is Boughdiriella chouetensis.	
Breskovskiceras bangilae	Sp. nov	Valid	Vermeulen, Damais & Lépinay	Early Cretaceous		France		
Breskovskiceras delavitae	Sp. nov	Valid	Vermeulen, Damais & Lépinay	Early Cretaceous		France		
Bullatimorphites frederiquei	Sp. nov	Valid	Martin & Mangold	Middle Jurassic (Bathonian)		France		
Bullatimorphites globulicostatus	Sp. nov	Valid	Martin & Mangold	Middle Jurassic (Bathonian)		France		
Cadoceras quenstedtiforme	Sp. nov	Valid	Mitta et al.	Middle Jurassic (Callovian)		Germany	A member of Cardioceratidae, a species of Cadoceras.	
Cadoceras wutachense	Sp. nov	Valid	Mitta et al.	Middle Jurassic (Callovian)		Germany	A member of Cardioceratidae, a species of Cadoceras.	
Calycoceras (Newboldiceras) tunisiense	Nom. nov	Valid	Kennedy & Gale	Late Cretaceous		Algeria; Tunisia	A replacement name for Acanthoceras jimboi var. tunetana Pervinquière (1907).	
Choctawites	Gen. et comb. nov	Valid	Korn & Titus in Titus et al.	Carboniferous (Mississippian)		United States	A member of Delepinoceratidae. A new genus for "Goniatites" choctawensis Shumard (1863); genus also contains "Glyphioceras" cumminsi Hyatt (1893) and "Goniatites" kentuckiensis Miller (1889).	
Choffatia schilleri	Sp. nov	Valid	Parent & Garrido	Middle Jurassic (late Callovian)	La Manga Formation	Argentina	A species of Choffatia.	
Cyrtoclymenia? magna	Sp. nov	Valid	Zong, Becker & Ma	Late Devonian (Famennian)	Hongguleleng Formation	China	A member of Cyrtoclymeniidae, possibly a species of Cyrtoclymenia.	
Deweveria kovalenkoi	Sp. nov	Valid	Smyshlyaeva & Zakharov	Early Triassic		Russia	A member of Hemilecanitidae, a species of Deweveria.	
Docidoceras tolleyi	Sp. nov	Valid	Sandoval & Chandler	Middle Jurassic		United Kingdom	A species of Docidoceras.	
Dzhulfites hebes	Sp. nov	Valid	Korn & Ghaderi in Korn et al.	Late Permian (Changhsingian)		Iran		
Dzhulfites zalensis	Sp. nov	Valid	Korn & Ghaderi in Korn et al.	Late Permian (Changhsingian)		Iran		
Eurites kuilukensis	Sp. nov	Valid	Konovalova	Carboniferous (late Tournaisian)		Uzbekistan	A species of Eurites.	
Extropharciceras gentile	Sp. nov	Valid	Bockwinkel, Becker & Ebbighausen	Devonian (late Givetian)		Morocco		
Extropharciceras serum	Sp. nov	Valid	Bockwinkel, Becker & Ebbighausen	Devonian (late Givetian)		Morocco		
Felisporadoceras nautilus	Sp. nov	Valid	Korn, Bockwinkel & Ebbighausen	Devonian (Famennian)		Morocco	A member of Sporadoceratidae, a species of Felisporadoceras.	
Foellmiceras	Gen. et comb. nov	Valid	Vermeulen et al.	Early Cretaceous (Barremian)		France	A member of the family Silesitidae. Genus includes "Ammonites" vulpes Coquand, in collect. Ph. Matheron, 1878 in Matheron (1880), as well as Foellmiceras typus (Milaschewitch, 1877) and Foellmiceras quinquesulcatus (Trautschold, 1886).	
Frogdenites fernandezlopezi	Sp. nov	Valid	Sandoval & Chandler	Middle Jurassic (early Bajocian)		Spain	A species of Frogdenites.	
Habadraites kulosiensis	Sp. nov	Valid	Konovalova	Carboniferous (late Tournaisian)		Uzbekistan	A species of Habadraites.	
Haoceras	Gen. et sp. nov	Valid	Balini & Zou in Zou et al.	Middle Triassic (late Ladinian)	Falang Formation	China	A member of Trachyceratidae. The type species is Haoceras xingyiense.	
Hemicymbites	Gen. et sp. et comb. nov	Valid	Dommergues	Early Jurassic (Sinemurian)		France	A member of Arietitidae. The type species is Hemicymbites tardiornatum; genus also contains "Ammonites" semicostulatus Reynès (1879).	
Hoploscaphites sargklofak	Sp. nov	Valid	Landman, Kennedy & Larson	Late Cretaceous (early Maastrichtian)	Bearpaw Shale; Lewis Shale; Pierre Shale	United States	A member of Scaphitidae, a species of Hoploscaphites.	
Idoceras pinonense	Sp. nov	Valid	Zell & Stinnesbeck	Late Jurassic (Kimmeridgian)	La Casita Formation	Mexico	A member of Perisphinctidae, a species of Idoceras.	
Julfotirolites	Gen. et sp. nov	Valid	Korn & Ghaderi in Korn et al.	Late Permian (Changhsingian)		Iran	The type species is Julfotirolites kozuri.	
Klugites	Gen. et comb. nov	Valid	Becker in Aboussalam, Becker & Bultynck	Devonian (Emsian)		Morocco	A member of Agoniatitida belonging to the family Mimoceratidae; a new genus for "Lenzites" gesinae Klug (2001).	
Labyrinthoceras dietzei	Sp. nov	Valid	Sandoval & Chandler	Middle Jurassic		Spain; United Kingdom	A species of Labyrinthoceras.	
Lotzeites elegans	Sp. nov	Valid	Kennedy & Gale	Late Cretaceous (Cenomanian)		Tunisia	A member of Euomphaloceratinae, a species of Lotzeites.	
Mimimitoceras alidrisii	Sp. nov	Valid	Korn, Bockwinkel & Ebbighausen	Late Devonian		Morocco	A member of Prionoceratidae, a species of Mimimitoceras.	
Mimimitoceras carnatum	Sp. nov	Valid	Korn, Bockwinkel & Ebbighausen	Late Devonian		Morocco	A member of Prionoceratidae, a species of Mimimitoceras.	
Mimimitoceras comtum	Sp. nov	Valid	Korn, Bockwinkel & Ebbighausen	Late Devonian		Morocco	A member of Prionoceratidae, a species of Mimimitoceras.	
Mimimitoceras endocuboide	Sp. nov	Valid	Korn, Bockwinkel & Ebbighausen	Late Devonian		Morocco	A member of Prionoceratidae, a species of Mimimitoceras.	
Mimimitoceras ibnishaqi	Sp. nov	Valid	Korn, Bockwinkel & Ebbighausen	Late Devonian		Morocco	A member of Prionoceratidae, a species of Mimimitoceras.	
Mimimitoceras taourirtense	Sp. nov	Valid	Korn, Bockwinkel & Ebbighausen	Late Devonian		Morocco	A member of Prionoceratidae, a species of Mimimitoceras.	
“Mimimitoceras” transiens	Sp. nov	Valid	Becker & Zong in Zong, Becker & Ma	Late Devonian (Famennian)	Heishantou Formation	China	A member of Prionoceratidae of uncertain phylogenetic placement.	
Mollistephanus ottiliae	Sp. nov	Valid	Galácz in Galácz, Dunai & Evanics	Middle Jurassic (early Bajocian)		Hungary	A member of Stephanoceratidae, a species of Mollistephanus.	
Mzerrebites amarensis	Sp. nov	Valid	Bockwinkel, Becker & Ebbighausen	Devonian (late Givetian)		Morocco		
Neoaganides ultimus	Sp. nov	Valid	Korn & Ghaderi in Korn et al.	Late Permian (Changhsingian)		Iran		
Neoastieria houilloni	Sp. nov	Valid	Vermeulen et al.	Early Cretaceous (Barremian)		France	A member of the family Silesitidae. Originally described as a species of Neoastieria, but subsequently transferred to the genus Nodososilesites.	
Neopronorites tenkensis	Sp. nov	Valid	Kutygin in Kutygin & Biakov	Permian (probably Artinskian)	Rodionovsky Formation	Russia	A member of Prolecanitida belonging to the family Pronoritidae, a species of Neopronorites.	
Nodopericyclus asiaticus	Sp. nov	Valid	Konovalova	Carboniferous (late Tournaisian)		Uzbekistan	A species of Nodopericyclus.	
Oraniceras scythicum	Sp. nov	Valid	Mitta	Middle Jurassic (Bathonian)	Djangura Formation	Russia	A member of Parkinsoniidae, a species of Oraniceras.	
Paramollistephanus	Gen. et comb. nov	Valid	Fernandez-Lopez & Pavia	Middle Jurassic	El Pedregal Formation; Snowshoe Formation	Spain; United States	A member of the family Stephanoceratidae. A new genus for "Mollistephanus" hispaniensis Fernandez-Lopez (1985); genus also includes "Stephanoceras" mowichense Imlay (1973) and "Stephanoceras (Phaulostephanus?)" oregonense Imlay (1973).	
Parasiacyclus	Gen. et sp. nov	Valid	Konovalova	Carboniferous (late Tournaisian)		Uzbekistan	A member of Pericyclidae. The type species is Parasiacyclus chatkalicus.	
Paratirolites birunii	Sp. nov	Valid	Korn & Ghaderi in Korn et al.	Late Permian (Changhsingian)		Iran		
Paratirolites coronatus	Sp. nov	Valid	Korn & Ghaderi in Korn et al.	Late Permian (Changhsingian)		Iran		
Paratirolites multiconus	Sp. nov	Valid	Korn & Ghaderi in Korn et al.	Late Permian (Changhsingian)		Iran		
Paratirolites quadratus	Sp. nov	Valid	Korn & Ghaderi in Korn et al.	Late Permian (Changhsingian)		Iran		
Paratirolites serus	Sp. nov	Valid	Korn & Ghaderi in Korn et al.	Late Permian (Changhsingian)		Iran		
Parrasiella	Gen. et comb. nov	Valid	Frau, Bulot & Wimbledon	Late Jurassic or Early Cretaceous		Cuba; Mexico	A himalayitid perisphinctoid. A new genus for "Durangites" astillerensis Imlay (1939); genus also contains "Durangites" rarifurcatus Imlay (1939), "Durangites" galeanense Cantú-Chapa (1968), "Durangites" latiumbilicatum Cantú-Chapa (1968) and "Durangites" juanensis Cantú-Chapa (1968).	
Petteroceras angustum	Sp. nov	Valid	Bockwinkel, Becker & Ebbighausen	Devonian (late Givetian)		Morocco		
Pharciceras oberbergense	Sp. nov	Valid	Bockwinkel & Korn	Devonian (late Givetian)		Germany		
Progeronia bruntrutense	Sp. nov	Valid	Comment et al.	Late Jurassic (Kimmeridgian)	Reuchenette Formation	Switzerland		
Protactoclymenia junggarensis	Sp. nov	Valid	Zong, Becker & Ma	Late Devonian (Famennian)	Hongguleleng Formation	China	A member of Cyrtoclymeniidae, a species of Protactoclymenia.	
Protactoclymenia parallela	Sp. nov	Valid	Zong, Becker & Ma	Late Devonian (Famennian)	Hongguleleng Formation	China	A member of Cyrtoclymeniidae, a species of Protactoclymenia.	
Pseudoflemingites evolutus	Sp. nov	Valid	Smyshlyaeva & Zakharov	Early Triassic		Russia	A member of Flemingitidae, a species of Pseudoflemingites.	
Pseudogastrioceras relicuum	Sp. nov	Valid	Korn & Ghaderi in Korn et al.	Late Permian (Changhsingian)		Iran		
Pseudoparodontoceras	Gen. et sp. nov	Valid	Parent et al.	Late Jurassic (Tithonian)	Vaca Muerta Formation	Argentina	A member of the family Neocomitidae. The type species is P. dezai.	
Psiloceras angulocostatum	Sp. nov	Valid	Von Hillebrandt & Kment	Early Jurassic (early Hettangian)		Austria	A species of Psiloceras.	
Rohillites orientalis	Sp. nov	Valid	Smyshlyaeva & Zakharov	Early Triassic		Russia	A member of Flemingitidae, a species of Rohillites.	
Schneidia zacatense	Sp. nov	Valid	Villaseñor, Moliner & Olóriz	Late Jurassic (early Kimmeridgian)		Mexico	A member of Ataxioceratinae, a species of Schneidia.	
Schrambachoceras	Gen. et comb. et sp. nov	Valid	Boorová et al.	Early Cretaceous (late Berriasian-early Valanginian,)		Austria; Spain	A member of Ancyloceratina related to Protancyloceras. A new genus for "Protancyloceras" obscurocostatum Vašíček & Hoedemaeker (2003); genus also contains a new species Schrambachoceras weidichi.	
Sharpeiceras minor	Sp. nov	Valid	Kennedy, Klinger & Lehmann	Late Cretaceous (early Cenomanian)	Mzinene Formation	South Africa	A relative of Mantelliceras, a species of Sharpeiceras.	
Sinomeginoceras	Gen. et 2 sp. nov	Valid	Balini & Zou in Zou et al.	Middle Triassic (late Ladinian)	Falang Formation	China	A member of Trachyceratidae. The type species is Sinomeginoceras wangi; genus also contains Sinomeginoceras xingyiense.	
Sporadoceras conforme	Sp. nov	Valid	Korn, Bockwinkel & Ebbighausen	Devonian (Famennian)		Morocco	A member of Sporadoceratidae, a species of Sporadoceras.	
Sporadoceras impressum	Sp. nov	Valid	Becker & Zong in Zong, Becker & Ma	Late Devonian (Famennian)	Hongguleleng Formation	China	A member of Sporadoceratidae, a species of Sporadoceras.	
Stolleyites terminalis	Sp. nov	Valid	Konstantinov	Middle Triassic (Ladinian)	Zhakan Formation	Russia	A member of Ceratitida belonging to the family Nathorstitidae.	
Stoyanowites aspinosus	Sp. nov	Valid	Korn & Ghaderi in Korn et al.	Late Permian (Changhsingian)		Iran		
Subradioceras	Gen. et sp. nov	Valid	Smyshlyaeva & Zakharov	Early Triassic		Russia	A member of Meekoceratidae. The type species is Subradioceras mikhailovichi.	
Takahashiceras	Nom. nov	Valid	Hoffmann & Howarth	Cretaceous		Japan	A member of Lytoceratidae; a replacement name for Takahashia Matsumoto (1984) and Takahashiella Cooper (2012) (both preoccupied).	
Tornoceras wunderlichi	Sp. nov	Valid	Bockwinkel & Korn	Devonian (late Givetian)		Germany		
Trilobiticeras (Emileites) kecskemetii	Sp. nov	Valid	Galácz in Galácz, Dunai & Evanics	Middle Jurassic (early Bajocian)		Hungary	A member of Otoitidae, a species of Trilobiticeras.	
Ungusporadoceras	Gen. et sp. nov	Valid	Korn, Bockwinkel & Ebbighausen	Devonian (Famennian)		Morocco	A member of Sporadoceratidae. The type species is Ungusporadoceras unguiforme.	
Uralyroceras	Gen. et comb. et. sp. nov	Valid	Korn & Titus in Titus et al.	Carboniferous (Mississippian)		Russia; Tajikistan; United States?	A member of Neoglyphioceratidae. A new genus for "Pachylyroceras" constrictum Ruzhencev & Bogoslovskaya (1971); genus also contains "Pachylyroceras" angustum Ruzhencev & Bogoslovskaya (1971), "Pachylyroceras" consequens Ruzhencev & Bogoslovskaya (1971), "Pachylyroceras" esini Nikolaeva (1994), new species Uralyroceras arquatum and possibly "Neoglyphioceras" hyatti Gordon (1965).	
Veranadaites	Gen. et sp. nov	Valid	Parent & Garrido	Late Jurassic (early Oxfordian)	La Manga Formation	Argentina	A sphaeroceratid ammonite related to the genus Araucanites. The type species is Veranadaites palmicostatus.	
Womalongiceras	Gen. et sp. nov	Valid	Morton et al.	Jurassic (probably Sinemurian or of slightly younger age)	Wulong Formation	China	Possibly a member of Schlotheimiidae. The type species is Womalongiceras inflatum.	
Yangites	Gen. et sp. et comb. nov	Valid	Balini & Zou in Zou et al.	Middle Triassic (late Ladinian)	Falang Formation	China	A member of Ceratitidae. The type species is Yangites densicostatus; genus also contains "Bulogites" langdaiensis Wang (1983).	

== Other cephalopods ==
Name	Novelty	Status	Authors	Age	Unit	Location	Notes	Images
Amphispirula	Gen. et sp. nov	Valid	Fuchs & Košťák	Eocene		Czech Republic	A relative of the ram's horn squid. The type species is Amphispirula herspica.	
Bactroceras boliviensis	Sp. nov	Valid	Aubrechtová	Ordovician (late Floian)	Pircancha Formation	Bolivia	A baltoceratid orthocerid, a species of Bactroceras.	
Bathmoceras holmi	Sp. nov	Valid	Mutvei	Ordovician		Estonia	A species of Bathmoceras.	
Cymatoceras nichollsi	Sp. nov	Valid	Grant-Mackie	Late Cretaceous (Haumurian)	Whangai Formation	New Zealand	A cymatoceratid nautiloid, a species of Cymatoceras.	
Euloxoceras buffalowallowense	Sp. nov	Valid	Niko & Mapes	Carboniferous (Chesterian)	Moorefield Formation	United States	An orthocerid, a species of Euloxoceras.	
Geisonocerina dargazense	Sp. nov	Valid	Ghavidel-Syooki et al.	Ordovician (Katian)		Iran	A species of Geisonocerina.	
Haboroteuthis	Gen. et sp. nov	Valid	Tanabe, Misaki & Ubukata	Late Cretaceous (probably late Santonian)	Haborogawa Formation	Japan	A squid of uncertain phylogenetic placement. The type species is Haboroteuthis poseidon.	
Lissajousibelus	Gen. et comb. nov	Valid	Weis et al.	Early Jurassic (Toarcian)		France	A belemnite; a new genus for "Belemnites" harleyi Mayer (1866).	
Michelinoceras hasei	Sp. nov	Valid	Niko et al.	Permian (Asselian)	Uyamano Formation	Japan		
Moorefieldoceras	Gen. et sp. nov	Valid	Niko & Mapes	Carboniferous (Chesterian)	Moorefield Formation	United States	An orthocerid. The type species is Moorefieldoceras yochelsoni.	
Mutveiceras	Gen. et sp. nov	Valid	Cichowolski et al.	Ordovician (Floian)	Acoite Formation	Argentina	An eothinoceratid nautiloid. The type species is Mutveiceras cienagaensis.	
Nanaimoteuthis hikidai	Sp. nov	Disputed	Tanabe, Misaki & Ubukata	Late Cretaceous (early Campanian)	Haborogawa Formation	Japan	A species of Nanaimoteuthis. Originally described as a relative of the vampire squid; Ikegami et al. (2026) reinterpreted is as an octopus belonging to the group Cirrata and a junior synonym of "Paleocirroteuthis" haggarti Tanabe et al. (2008), recombined as Nanaimoteuthis haggarti.	
Peripetoceras milleri	Sp. nov	Valid	Niko & Mapes	Carboniferous (Chesterian)	Moorefield Formation	United States	A nautilid, a species of Peripetoceras.	
Pumiliobelus	Gen. et 2 sp. nov	Valid	Williamson & Henderson	Late Cretaceous (Cenomanian)	Gearle Siltstone of the Carnarvon Basin	Australia	A dimitobelid belemnite. Genus contains two species: P. haigi and P. tumidus.	
Rachiteuthis acutali	Sp. nov	Valid	Jattiot et al.	Late Cretaceous (Cenomanian)		Lebanon	A coleoid cephalopod, a species of Rachiteuthis.	
Rarobelus	Nom. nov	Valid	Nalnjaeva in Dzyuba et al.	Jurassic (early Toarcian-early Aalenian)		Greenland; Russia; United Kingdom?	A megateuthidid belemnite; a replacement name for Orthobelus Nalnjaeva in Sachs & Nalnjaeva (1970) (preoccupied).	
Saloceras quena	Sp. nov	Valid	Cichowolski et al.	Ordovician (Floian)	Acoite Formation	Argentina	An eothinoceratid nautiloid, a species of Saloceras.	
Saloceras sikus	Sp. nov	Valid	Cichowolski et al.	Ordovician (Floian)	Acoite Formation	Argentina	An eothinoceratid nautiloid, a species of Saloceras.	
Sibumasuoceras	Gen. et comb. nov	Valid	Niko & Sone	Ordovician		Malaysia; Myanmar	A member of Pseudorthoceratidae; a new genus for "Ormoceras" langkawiense Kobayashi (1959).	

== Gastropods ==
Name	Novelty	Status	Authors	Age	Unit	Location	Notes	Images
Acicula giuntellii	Sp. nov	Valid	Harzhauser, Neubauer & Esu in Harzhauser et al.	Miocene (late Messinian)		Italy	A member of Aciculidae, a species of Acicula.	
Aclis insolita	Sp. nov	Valid	Lozouet	Oligocene		France	A species of Aclis.	
Agathotoma pseudolabratula	Sp. nov	Valid	Lozouet	Oligocene		France	A species of Agathotoma.	
Agatrix petiti	Sp. nov	Valid	Lozouet	Oligocene		France	A species of Agatrix.	
Alvania doliolum	Sp. nov	Valid	Lozouet	Oligocene		France	A species of Alvania.	
Alvania falsivenus	Sp. nov	Valid	Lozouet	Oligocene		France	A species of Alvania.	
Alvania subgaleodinopsis	Sp. nov	Valid	Lozouet	Oligocene		France	A species of Alvania.	
Anematina rugoza	Sp. nov	Valid	Mazaev	Permian (Kazanian)		Russia	A member of Elasmonematidae, a species of Anematina.	
Anodomaria kosmajae	Sp. nov	Valid	Ayoub-Hannaa et al.	Late Cretaceous (early Cenomanian)		Serbia	A sea snail, a species of Anodomaria.	
Anodomaria staufensis	Sp. nov	Valid	Gründel & Nützel	Early Jurassic (Pliensbachian)	Amaltheenton Formation	Germany	A sea snail, a species of Anodomaria.	
Anomphalus barskovi	Sp. nov	Valid	Mazaev	Permian (Kazanian)		Russia	A member of Anomphalidae, a species of Anomphalus.	
Anulifera sigmoidea	Sp. nov	Valid	Ferrari & Damborenea	Middle Jurassic (early Bajocian)	Neuquén Basin	Argentina	A member of Protorculidae, a species of Anulifera.	
Arribazona burovi	Sp. nov	Valid	Mazaev	Permian (Kazanian)		Russia	A member of Orthonematidae, a species of Arribazona.	
Arribazona longispira	Sp. nov	Valid	Mazaev	Permian (Kazanian)		Russia	A member of Orthonematidae, a species of Arribazona.	
Asthenotoma juvenilis	Sp. nov	Valid	Lozouet	Oligocene		France	A species of Asthenotoma.	
Atopippeutis	Gen. et sp. nov	Valid	Kadolsky	Oligocene		Germany	A segmentinine planorbid. The type species is Atopippeutis muelleri.	
Barleeia gursi	Sp. nov	Valid	Lozouet	Oligocene		France	A species of Barleeia.	
Bathrotomaria kronzwilmesorum	Sp. nov	Valid	Gatto et al.	Early Jurassic		France	A species of Bathrotomaria.	
Baylea chimbulatiensis	Sp. nov	Valid	Mazaev	Permian (Kazanian)		Russia	A member of Phymatopleuridae, a species of Baylea.	
Baylea foraminata	Sp. nov	Valid	Mazaev	Permian (Kazanian)		Russia	A member of Phymatopleuridae, a species of Baylea.	
Baylea nemdaensis	Sp. nov	Valid	Mazaev	Permian (Kazanian)		Russia	A member of Phymatopleuridae, a species of Baylea.	
Baylea rigida	Sp. nov	Valid	Mazaev	Permian (Kazanian)		Russia	A member of Phymatopleuridae, a species of Baylea.	
Baylea vjatkensis	Sp. nov	Valid	Mazaev	Permian (Kazanian)		Russia	A member of Phymatopleuridae, a species of Baylea.	
Bela annemariae	Sp. nov	Valid	Lozouet	Oligocene		France	A species of Bela.	
Bela fiorentina	Sp. nov	Valid	Della Bella, Naldi & Scarponi	Plio-Pleistocene		Italy	A species of Bela.	
Bela plagisculpta	Sp. nov	Valid	Della Bella, Naldi & Scarponi	Plio-Pleistocene		Italy	A species of Bela.	
Bela pseudoexilis	Sp. nov	Valid	Della Bella, Naldi & Scarponi	Plio-Pleistocene		Italy	A species of Bela.	
Belgrandia velonae	Sp. nov	Valid	Esu & Girotti	Miocene (early Messinian)	Velona Basin	Italy	A species of Belgrandia.	
Belidaphne brunettii	Sp. nov	Valid	Della Bella, Naldi & Scarponi	Pliocene		Italy	A member of Mangeliidae.	
Benoistia chavani	Sp. nov	Valid	Pacaud	Paleocene (Danian)		France	A member of Brachytrematidae, a species of Benoistia.	
Berthella arctata	Sp. nov	Valid	Pacaud	Paleocene (Danian)		France	A member of Pleurobranchidae, a species of Berthella.	
Berthella jodiae	Sp. nov	Valid	Pacaud	Eocene (Bartonian)		France	A member of Pleurobranchidae, a species of Berthella.	
Berthella pristina	Sp. nov	Valid	Pacaud	Paleocene (Danian)		France	A member of Pleurobranchidae, a species of Berthella.	
Biarmeaspira jusupovi	Sp. nov	Valid	Mazaev	Permian (Kazanian)		Russia	A member of Phymatopleuridae, a species of Biarmeaspira.	
Biarmeaspira striata	Sp. nov	Valid	Mazaev	Permian (Kazanian)		Russia	A member of Phymatopleuridae, a species of Biarmeaspira.	
Bipartopsis	Gen. et sp. nov	Valid	Gründel, Keupp & Lang	Late Jurassic (Kimmeridgian)		Germany	A sea snail belonging to the family Neritopsidae. The type species is Bipartopsis robustus.	
Boreioconus	Gen. et sp. nov	Valid	Guzhov & Zakharov	Mesozoic		Russia	A member of Pectinibranchia. The type species is Boreioconus bojarkensis.	
Brachystomia cantaurana	Sp. nov	Valid	Landau & LaFollette	Miocene	Cantaure Formation	Venezuela	A member of Pyramidellidae, a species of Brachystomia.	
Brasovia	Nom. nov	Valid	Neubauer et al.	Miocene to Pliocene		Romania; Ukraine	A member of Hydrobiidae; a replacement name for Aluta Jekelius (1932) (preoccupied).	
Bulimorpha lavrskyi	Sp. nov	Valid	Mazaev	Permian (Kazanian)		Russia	A member of Soleniscidae, a species of Bulimorpha.	
Buttenheimia	Gen. et sp. nov	Valid	Nützel & Gründel	Early Jurassic (Pliensbachian)	Amaltheenton Formation	Germany	Genus includes new species Buttenheimia dietzi.	
Caecum nemoralis	Sp. nov	Valid	Lozouet	Oligocene		France	A species of Caecum.	
Campeloma acroterion	Sp. nov	Valid	Hartman	Latest Cretaceous and early Paleocene	Fort Union Formation; Hell Creek Formation	United States	A species of Campeloma.	
Camponaxis? jaegeri	Sp. nov	Valid	Gründel & Nützel	Early Jurassic (Pliensbachian)	Amaltheenton Formation	Germany	A sea snail belonging to the family Tofanellidae, possibly a species of Camponaxis.	
Camponaxis jurassica	Sp. nov	Valid	Nützel & Gründel	Early Jurassic (Pliensbachian)	Amaltheenton Formation	Germany		
Carychium galli	Sp. nov	Valid	Salvador	Miocene		Germany	A species of Carychium.	
Cassianopsis eversi	Sp. nov	Valid	Gründel, Keupp & Lang	Late Jurassic (Kimmeridgian)		Germany	A sea snail belonging to the family Neritopsidae; a species of Cassianopsis.	
Cassianopsis ratua	Sp. nov	Valid	Gründel, Keupp & Lang	Late Jurassic (Kimmeridgian)		Germany	A sea snail belonging to the family Neritopsidae; a species of Cassianopsis.	
Cataldia	Gen. et comb. nov	Valid	Calzada & Corbacho	Cretaceous		Spain; Argentina? Japan?	A member of Batillariidae. A new genus for "Confusiscala" caneroti Calzada (1973); genus also includes "Cerithium" mirambelensis Vilanova and possibly also Pyrazus? scalariformis Nagao (1934).	
Ceratia meridionalis	Sp. nov	Valid	Lozouet	Oligocene		France	A member of Iravadiidae, a species of Ceratia.	
Chauvetia inopinata	Sp. nov	Valid	Landau, da Silva & Vermeij	Miocene (late Burdigalian-early Langhian boundary)	Cantaure Formation	Venezuela	A member of Buccinidae, a species of Chauvetia.	
Chemnitzia macsotayi	Sp. nov	Valid	Landau & LaFollette	Miocene	Cantaure Formation	Venezuela	A member of Pyramidellidae, a species of Chemnitzia.	
Chevallieria stampinensis	Sp. nov	Valid	Lozouet	Oligocene		France	A member of Iravadiidae, a species of Chevallieria.	
Chrysallida cantaurana	Sp. nov	Valid	Landau & LaFollette	Miocene	Cantaure Formation	Venezuela	A member of Pyramidellidae, a species of Chrysallida.	
Cima oligocaenica	Sp. nov	Valid	Lozouet	Oligocene		France	A species of Cima.	
Cima planorbiformis	Sp. nov	Valid	Lozouet	Oligocene		France	A species of Cima.	
Cima tenuispina	Sp. nov	Valid	Lozouet	Oligocene		France	A species of Cima.	
Cima virodunensis	Sp. nov	Valid	Lozouet	Oligocene		France	A species of Cima.	
Cittarium praepica	Sp. nov	Valid	Landau, Kronenberg & da Silva	Late Miocene	Cercado Formation	Dominican Republic	A species of Cittarium.	
Clithon (Pictoneritina) hillae	Sp. nov	Valid	Symonds	Eocene (Priabonian)	Bouldnor Formation	United Kingdom	A species of Clithon.	
Clithon (Pictoneritina) mortoni	Sp. nov	Valid	Symonds	Eocene (Priabonian)	Bouldnor Formation	United Kingdom	A species of Clithon.	
Clithon (Pictoneritina) pococki	Sp. nov	Valid	Symonds	Eocene (Priabonian)	Headon Hill Formation	United Kingdom	A species of Clithon.	
Cochlicopa fassabortoloi	Sp. nov	Valid	Harzhauser, Neubauer & Esu in Harzhauser et al.	Miocene (late Messinian)		Italy	A member of Cochlicopidae, a species of Cochlicopa.	
Colubratriton	Gen. et comb. et 2 sp. nov	Valid	Pacaud, Ledon & Loubry	Eocene (Ypresian to Lutetian)	Paris Basin	France	A member of Cancellariidae belonging to the subfamily Plesiotritoninae. Genus includes "Plesiotriton" deshayesianus Beu & Maxwell (1987), as well as new species Colubratriton garini and Colubratriton merlei.	
Columbarium antecedens	Nom. nov	Valid	Pacaud	Paleocene (Danian)		Belgium; Crimean Peninsula; France; Poland; Ukraine	A member of Turbinellidae, a species of Columbarium. A replacement name for Fusus heberti Briart & Cornet (1877) (preoccupied).	
Conasprella (Ximeniconus) ageri	Sp. nov	Valid	Hendricks	Early Pliocene	Gurabo Formation	Dominican Republic	A member of Conidae, a species of Conasprella.	
Confusiscala nackiji	Sp. nov	Valid	Blagovetshenskiy	Early Cretaceous		Russia	A wentletrap, a species of Confusiscala.	
Conus anningae	Sp. nov	Valid	Hendricks	Early Pliocene	Gurabo Formation	Dominican Republic	A member of Conidae, a species of Conus.	
Conus (Stephanoconus) bellacoensis	Sp. nov	Valid	Hendricks	Late Miocene to early Pliocene	Cercado Formation; Gurabo Formation	Dominican Republic	A member of Conidae, a species of Conus.	
Conus (Lautoconus?) carlottae	Sp. nov	Valid	Hendricks	Late Miocene to early Pliocene	Cercado Formation; Gurabo Formation	Dominican Republic	A member of Conidae, a species of Conus.	
Conus (Ductoconus) cashi	Sp. nov	Valid	Hendricks	Late Miocene to early Pliocene	Cercado Formation; Gurabo Formation	Dominican Republic	A member of Conidae, a species of Conus.	
Conus (Atlanticonus?) franklinae	Sp. nov	Valid	Hendricks	Late Miocene to early Pliocene	Cercado Formation; Gurabo Formation	Dominican Republic	A member of Conidae, a species of Conus.	
Conus (Dauciconus) garrisoni	Sp. nov	Valid	Hendricks	Late Miocene	Cercado Formation	Dominican Republic	A member of Conidae, a species of Conus.	
Conus (Stephanoconus) gouldi	Sp. nov	Valid	Hendricks	Late Miocene	Cercado Formation	Dominican Republic	A member of Conidae, a species of Conus.	
Conus (Spuriconus?) kaesleri	Sp. nov	Valid	Hendricks	Early Pliocene	Gurabo Formation	Dominican Republic	A member of Conidae, a species of Conus.	
Conus (Spuriconus?) lombardii	Sp. nov	Valid	Hendricks	Late Miocene	Cercado Formation	Dominican Republic	A member of Conidae, a species of Conus.	
Conus lyelli	Sp. nov	Valid	Hendricks	Late Miocene to early Pliocene	Cercado Formation; Gurabo Formation	Dominican Republic	A member of Conidae, a species of Conus.	
Conus (Dauciconus?) zambaensis	Sp. nov	Valid	Hendricks	Early Pliocene	Gurabo Formation	Dominican Republic	A member of Conidae, a species of Conus.	
Coptostoma marcominii	Sp. nov	Valid	Lozouet	Oligocene		France	A member of Cancellariidae, a species of Coptostoma.	
Costasphaera	Gen. et sp. nov	Valid	Nützel & Gründel	Early Jurassic (Pliensbachian)	Amaltheenton Formation	Germany	Genus includes new species Costasphaera franconica.	
Costataphrus weissmuelleri	Sp. nov	Valid	Gründel & Nützel	Early Jurassic (Pliensbachian)	Amaltheenton Formation	Germany	A sea snail belonging to the family Ataphridae, a species of Costataphrus.	
Costoanachis peyrehoradensis	Sp. nov	Valid	Lozouet	Oligocene		France	A species of Costoanachis.	
Costoanachis praeterebralis	Sp. nov	Valid	Lozouet	Oligocene		France	A species of Costoanachis.	
Crassispira aster	Sp. nov	Valid	Lozouet	Oligocene		France	A species of Crassispira.	
Crassispira lagouardensis	Sp. nov	Valid	Lozouet	Oligocene		France	A species of Crassispira.	
Crassispira lesbarritzensis	Sp. nov	Valid	Lozouet	Oligocene		France	A species of Crassispira.	
Crossostoma spiralocosta	Sp. nov	Valid	Gründel & Nützel	Early Jurassic (Pliensbachian)	Amaltheenton Formation	Germany	A sea snail belonging to the family Ataphridae, a species of Crossostoma.	
Cryptaulax johanni	Sp. nov	Valid	Nützel & Gründel	Early Jurassic (Pliensbachian)	Amaltheenton Formation	Germany		
Cryptaulax weaveri	Sp. nov	Valid	Ferrari & Damborenea	Middle Jurassic (early Bajocian)	Neuquén Basin	Argentina	A member of Procerithiidae, a species of Cryptaulax.	
Dauterria	Gen. et 2 sp. nov	Valid	Gründel, Keupp & Lang	Late Jurassic (Kimmeridgian)		Germany	A sea snail belonging to the family Pileolidae. The type species is Dauterria variocostata; genus also contains Dauterria rotundata.	
Delminiella norica	Sp. nov	Valid	Harzhauser, Mandic & Neubauer in Harzhauser et al.	Late Early Miocene		Austria	A member of the superfamily Lymnaeoidea, possibly a member of the family Lymnaeidae; a species of Delminiella.	
Dentimargo elusiva	Sp. nov	Valid	Sosso, Brunetti & Dell'Angelo	Miocene (Tortonian)		Italy	A member of Marginellidae, a species of Dentimargo.	
Diodora copiosa	Sp. nov	Valid	Berezovsky	Eocene		Ukraine	A species of Diodora.	
Diodora parra	Sp. nov	Valid	Berezovsky & Girik	Eocene		Ukraine	A species of Diodora.	
Donaldina dubia	Sp. nov	Valid	Mazaev	Permian (Kazanian)		Russia	A member of Donaldinidae, a species of Donaldina.	
Donaldina parva	Sp. nov	Valid	Mazaev	Permian (Kazanian)		Russia	A member of Donaldinidae, a species of Donaldina.	
Drilliola terranigra	Sp. nov	Valid	Lozouet	Oligocene		France	A species of Drilliola.	
Eucochlis obliquecostata	Sp. nov	Valid	Nützel in Hautmann et al.	Early Triassic		China	A member of Trochoidea belonging to the family Eucochlidae, a species of Eucochlis.	
Eirlysia globosa	Sp. nov	Valid	Mazaev	Permian (Kazanian)		Russia	A member of Phymatopleuridae, a species of Eirlysia.	
Eirlysia lata	Sp. nov	Valid	Mazaev	Permian (Kazanian)		Russia	A member of Phymatopleuridae, a species of Eirlysia.	
Eirlysia lens	Sp. nov	Valid	Mazaev	Permian (Kazanian)		Russia	A member of Phymatopleuridae, a species of Eirlysia.	
Eirlysia nodata	Sp. nov	Valid	Mazaev	Permian (Kazanian)		Russia	A member of Phymatopleuridae, a species of Eirlysia.	
Eirlysia scalare	Sp. nov	Valid	Mazaev	Permian (Kazanian)		Russia	A member of Phymatopleuridae, a species of Eirlysia.	
Eirlysia seminuda	Sp. nov	Valid	Mazaev	Permian (Kazanian)		Russia	A member of Phymatopleuridae, a species of Eirlysia.	
Eirlysia undata	Sp. nov	Valid	Mazaev	Permian (Kazanian)		Russia	A member of Phymatopleuridae, a species of Eirlysia.	
Eocypraea sautereaui	Sp. nov	Valid	Belliard & Gain			France		
Eratoidea antoniae	Sp. nov	Valid	Sosso, Brunetti & Dell'Angelo	Miocene (Tortonian)		Italy	A member of Marginellidae, a species of Eratoidea.	
Eulimella dianeae	Sp. nov	Valid	Landau & LaFollette	Miocene	Cantaure Formation	Venezuela	A member of Pyramidellidae, a species of Eulimella.	
Eunerinea? neuqueniana	Sp. nov	Valid	Ferrari & Damborenea	Middle Jurassic (early Bajocian)	Neuquén Basin	Argentina	A member of Eunerineidae, possibly a species of Eunerinea.	
Fetaspira	Gen. et sp. nov	Valid	Mazaev	Permian (Kazanian)		Russia	A member of Phymatopleuridae. The type species is Fetaspira semifacta.	
Floribella mus	Sp. nov	Valid	Lozouet	Oligocene		France	A member of Aplysiidae, a species of Floribella.	
Fusiaphera esus	Sp. nov	Valid	Pacaud, Ledon & Loubry	Eocene (Ypresian)	Paris Basin	France	A member of Cancellariidae, a species of Fusiaphera.	
Fusiaphera kassitiana	Sp. nov	Valid	Pacaud, Ledon & Loubry	Late Cretaceous (Maastrichtian)		Iran	A member of Cancellariidae, a species of Fusiaphera.	
Fusinus raouli	Sp. nov	Valid	Lozouet	Oligocene		France	A species of Fusinus.	
Gibboscala simbirskensis	Sp. nov	Valid	Blagovetshenskiy	Early Cretaceous		Russia	A wentletrap, a species of Gibboscala.	
Glabrocingulum piktorskyi	Sp. nov	Valid	Mazaev	Permian (Kazanian)		Russia	A member of Eotomariidae, a species of Glabrocingulum.	
Globosospirina	Gen. et sp. nov	Valid	Waterhouse	Permian	Tiverton Formation	Australia	A member of Eotomariidae. The type species is G. mcclungi.	
Globularia andina	Sp. nov	Valid	Ferrari & Damborenea	Middle Jurassic (early Bajocian)	Neuquén Basin	Argentina	A member of Ampullinidae, a species of Globularia.	
?Goniochilus achaiae	Sp. nov	Valid	Esu & Girotti	Early Pleistocene	Synania Formation	Greece	A member of Hydrobiidae, possibly a species of Goniochilus.	
Goniodostomia bicarinata	Sp. nov	Valid	Landau & LaFollette	Miocene	Cantaure Formation	Venezuela	A member of Pyramidellidae, a species of Goniodostomia.	
Gyraulus sauerzopfi	Nom. nov	Valid	Neubauer et al.	Miocene (late Serravallian)		Austria; Romania; Slovakia; Slovenia	A member of Planorbidae; a replacement name for Gyraulus vermicularis (Stoliczka, 1862) (preoccupied).	
Hayamiella schaeferi	Sp. nov	Valid	Gründel, Keupp & Lang	Late Jurassic (Kimmeridgian)		Germany	A sea snail belonging to the family Neritopsidae; a species of Hayamiella.	
?Helicopsis piedmontanica	Sp. nov	Valid	Harzhauser, Neubauer & Esu in Harzhauser et al.	Miocene (late Messinian)		Italy	A member of Hygromiidae, possibly a species of Helicopsis.	
Hydrocena moncuccoensis	Sp. nov	Valid	Harzhauser, Neubauer & Esu in Harzhauser et al.	Miocene (late Messinian)		Italy	A member of Hydrocenidae, a species of Hydrocena.	
Hyphantozyga noinskyi	Sp. nov	Valid	Mazaev	Permian (Kazanian)		Russia	A member of Pseudozygopleuridae, a species of Hyphantozyga.	
Iolaea miocenica	Sp. nov	Valid	Landau & LaFollette	Miocene	Cantaure Formation	Venezuela	A member of Pyramidellidae. Originally described as a species of Iolaea, but subsequently transferred to the genus Mulderia.	
Iselica belliata	Sp. nov	Valid	Landau & LaFollette	Miocene	Cantaure Formation	Venezuela	A member of Pyramidellidae, a species of Iselica.	
Islamia amiatae	Sp. nov	Valid	Esu & Girotti	Miocene (early Messinian)	Velona Basin	Italy	A species of Islamia.	
Islamia bambolii	Sp. nov	Valid	Esu & Girotti	Miocene (late Tortonian)	Baccinello-Cinigiano Basin	Italy	A species of Islamia.	
?Islamia corinthica	Sp. nov	Valid	Esu & Girotti	Early Pleistocene	Synania Formation	Greece	Possibly a species of Islamia.	
Ividella guppyi	Sp. nov	Valid	Landau & LaFollette	Miocene	Cantaure Formation	Venezuela	A member of Pyramidellidae, a species of Ividella.	
Jania colridusensis	Sp. nov	Valid	Pacaud & Leroy in Pacaud	Paleocene (Thanetian)		France	A member of Buccinidae, a species of Jania.	
Juvenispira	Gen. et sp. nov	Valid	Mazaev	Permian (Kazanian)		Russia	A member of Phymatopleuridae. The type species is Juvenispira esaulovae.	
Kadolskya	Gen. et comb. nov		Neubauer & Harzhauser in Neubauer, Mandic & Harzhauser	Miocene (Langhian)		Croatia	A member of Hydrobiidae; a new genus for "Lithoglyphus" panicum Neumayr (1869).	
Kazanella	Gen. et comb. nov	Junior homonym	Mazaev	Permian (Kazanian)		Russia	A member of Orthonematidae. The type species is "Turbonilla" volgensis Golowkinsky (1868). The generic name is a junior homonym of Kazanella Martynov (1930). Mazaev (2016) coined a replacement generic name Kazankiella	
Kleinella pumila	Sp. nov	Valid	Landau & LaFollette	Miocene	Cantaure Formation	Venezuela	A member of Pyramidellidae, a species of Kleinella.	
Laeviphitus aquitanicus	Sp. nov	Valid	Lozouet	Miocene		France	A member of Elachisinidae, a species of Laeviphitus.	
Latiala? callositae	Sp. nov	Valid	Ayoub-Hannaa et al.	Late Cretaceous (early Cenomanian)		Serbia	A sea snail, possibly a species of Latiala.	
Latirulus ferratus	Sp. nov	Valid	Lozouet	Oligocene		France	A species of Latirulus.	
Latirulus lesbarritzensis	Sp. nov	Valid	Lozouet	Oligocene		France	A species of Latirulus.	
Latirulus poustagnacensis	Sp. nov	Valid	Lozouet	Oligocene		France	A species of Latirulus.	
Latirulus rivulensis	Sp. nov	Valid	Lozouet	Oligocene		France	A species of Latirulus.	
Latirulus subangulatus	Sp. nov	Valid	Lozouet	Oligocene		France	A species of Latirulus.	
Latirulus virodunensis	Sp. nov	Valid	Lozouet	Oligocene		France	A species of Latirulus.	
Leptoptygma gremechaensis	Sp. nov	Valid	Mazaev	Permian (Kazanian)		Russia	A species of Leptoptygma.	
Levizygopleura elegans	Sp. nov	Valid	Mazaev	Permian (Kazanian)		Russia	A member of Pseudozygopleuridae, a species of Levizygopleura.	
Lithoglyphus marci	Sp. nov	Valid	Esu & Girotti	Early Pleistocene	Synania Formation	Greece	A species of Lithoglyphus.	
Loxacypraea plumbea	Sp. nov	Valid	Dolin	Early Miocene		France	A member of Cypraeidae, a species of Loxacypraea.	
Loxacypraea testudinea	Sp. nov	Valid	Dolin	Early Miocene		United States	A member of Cypraeidae, a species of Loxacypraea.	
Loxacypraea utricula	Sp. nov	Valid	Dolin	Early Miocene		France	A member of Cypraeidae, a species of Loxacypraea.	
Lucilla miocaenica	Sp. nov	Valid	Harzhauser, Neubauer & Esu in Harzhauser et al.	Miocene (late Messinian)		Italy	A member of Helicodiscidae, a species of Lucilla.	
Lutetiella	Gen. et sp. et comb. nov	Valid	Kadolsky	Eocene		France; Germany	Possibly a member of Hydrobiidae. The type species is Lutetiella hartkopfi; genus also contains "Paludina" conica Prévost (1821).	
Lyrofusus grateloupi	Sp. nov	Valid	Lozouet	Oligocene		France	A member of Buccinidae, a species of Lyrofusus.	
Macromphalus agnesae	Sp. nov	Valid	Pacaud & Pons	Eocene (Lutetian)		France	A species of Macromphalus.	
“Marginella” giuntellii	Sp. nov	Valid	Sosso, Brunetti & Dell'Angelo	Miocene (Tortonian)		Italy	A member of Marginellidae, possibly a species of Marginella.	
Marloffsteinia	Gen. et comb. nov	Valid	Nützel & Gründel	Jurassic (Pliensbachian to Kimmeridgian)		Germany	A sea snail belonging to the family Eucycloscalidae. The type species is "Turbo" cyclostoma Benz in Zieten (1832); genus also includes "Turbo" funatoides Quenstedt (1881–84).	
Medfrazyga? zaitzevi	Sp. nov	Valid	Mazaev	Permian (Kazanian)		Russia	A member of Palaeozygopleuridae, possibly a species of Medfrazyga.	
Megatyloma forticallosa	Sp. nov	Valid	Lozouet	Oligocene		France	A member of Tornidae, a species of Megatyloma.	
Megistocerithium	Gen. et sp. nov	Valid	Kase in Kase et al.	Miocene		Indonesia; Philippines	A member of Cerithioidea, possibly a member or a relative of the family Eustomatidae. The type species is Megistocerithium magoi.	
Melanopsis glaubrechti	Sp. nov	Valid	Neubauer & Harzhauser in Neubauer, Harzhauser & Pipík	Late Miocene	Martin Formation	Slovakia	A member of Melanopsidae, a species of Melanopsis.	
Melanopsis synaniae	Sp. nov	Valid	Esu & Girotti	Early Pleistocene	Synania Formation	Greece	A species of Melanopsis.	
Melanopsis wilhelmi	Sp. nov	Valid	Esu & Girotti	Pleistocene		Italy	A species of Melanopsis.	
Mercuria baccinelliana	Sp. nov	Valid	Esu & Girotti	Miocene (late Tortonian)	Baccinello-Cinigiano Basin	Italy	A species of Mercuria.	
Metaconulus mauliaensis	Sp. nov	Valid	Belliard & Gain			France		
Mexipyrgus viescaensis	Sp. nov	Valid	Czaja, Estrada-Rodríguez & Romero-Méndez	Holocene (sub-recent)		Mexico	A species of Mexipyrgus.	
Mitrella (Bastropia) llajasensis	Sp. nov	Valid	Squires	Early Eocene	Llajas Formation	United States	A member of Columbellidae, a species of Mitrella.	
Mitrella repens	Sp. nov	Valid	Lozouet	Oligocene		France	A species of Mitrella.	
Mitrella subinflata	Sp. nov	Valid	Lozouet	Oligocene		France	A species of Mitrella.	
Mitrella vaporis	Sp. nov	Valid	Lozouet	Oligocene		France	A species of Mitrella.	
Mitrolumna atypica	Sp. nov	Valid	Lozouet	Oligocene		France	A species of Mitrolumna.	
Mitrolumna oligomiocenica	Sp. nov	Valid	Lozouet	Oligocene		France	A species of Mitrolumna.	
Mitrolumna peyroti	Sp. nov	Valid	Lozouet	Oligocene		France	A species of Mitrolumna.	
Mitrolumna ventriosa	Sp. nov	Valid	Lozouet	Oligocene		France	A species of Mitrolumna.	
Nassaria europaea	Sp. nov	Valid	Lozouet	Oligocene		France	A species of Nassaria.	
Nassarius brebioni	Sp. nov	Valid	Van Dingenen et al.	Pliocene-Pleistocene		France	A member of Nassariidae, a species of Nassarius.	
Nassarius columbinus	Sp. nov	Valid	Van Dingenen et al.	Pliocene-Pleistocene		France	A member of Nassariidae, a species of Nassarius.	
Nassarius gendryi	Sp. nov	Valid	Van Dingenen et al.	Pliocene-Pleistocene		France	A member of Nassariidae, a species of Nassarius.	
Nassarius landreauensis	Sp. nov	Valid	Van Dingenen et al.	Pliocene-Pleistocene		France	A member of Nassariidae, a species of Nassarius.	
Nassarius martae	Sp. nov	Valid	Van Dingenen et al.	Pliocene-Pleistocene		France	A member of Nassariidae, a species of Nassarius.	
Nassarius merlei	Sp. nov	Valid	Van Dingenen et al.	Pliocene-Pleistocene		France	A member of Nassariidae, a species of Nassarius.	
Nassarius pacaudi	Sp. nov	Valid	Van Dingenen et al.	Pliocene-Pleistocene		France	A member of Nassariidae, a species of Nassarius.	
Nassarius palumbis	Sp. nov	Valid	Van Dingenen et al.	Pliocene-Pleistocene		France	A member of Nassariidae, a species of Nassarius.	
Nassarius plainei	Sp. nov	Valid	Van Dingenen et al.	Pliocene-Pleistocene		France	A member of Nassariidae, a species of Nassarius.	
Nassarius poteriensis	Sp. nov	Valid	Van Dingenen et al.	Pliocene-Pleistocene		France	A member of Nassariidae, a species of Nassarius.	
Nassarius turpis	Sp. nov	Valid	Van Dingenen et al.	Pliocene-Pleistocene		France	A member of Nassariidae, a species of Nassarius.	
Naticopsis? koljanuriensis	Sp. nov	Valid	Mazaev	Permian (Kazanian)		Russia	A member of Naticopsidae, possibly a species of Naticopsis.	
Neilsonia nuda	Sp. nov	Valid	Mazaev	Permian (Kazanian)		Russia	A member of Eotomariidae, a species of Neilsonia.	
Nemdaella	Gen. et sp. nov	Valid	Mazaev	Permian (Kazanian)		Russia	A member of Meekospiridae. The type species is Nemdaella leonovae.	
Nixipileolus	Gen. et sp. nov	Valid	Guzhov & Zakharov	Mesozoic		Russia	A member of Pectinibranchia. The type species is Nixipileolus depressus.	
Nodosotrochus	Gen. et sp. et comb. nov	Valid	Gründel & Nützel	Early Jurassic		France; Germany; Italy	A sea snail belonging to the family Eucycloscalidae. The type species is Nodosotrochus tricostatus; genus also contains, among others, "Trypanotrochus" broesamleni Gründel (2007), "Turbo" escheri Münster in Goldfuss (1844) and "Trochus" gaudryanus d’Orbigny (1853).	
Novlepatella kossovajae	Sp. nov	Valid	Mazaev	Permian (Kazanian)		Russia	A member of Damilinidae, a species of Novlepatella.	
Palaeostylus krasnovidovoensis	Sp. nov	Valid	Mazaev	Permian (Kazanian)		Russia	A member of Palaeostylidae, a species of Palaeostylus.	
Palaeostylus krotovi	Sp. nov	Valid	Mazaev	Permian (Kazanian)		Russia	A member of Palaeostylidae, a species of Palaeostylus.	
Palaeostylus kukarkensis	Sp. nov	Valid	Mazaev	Permian (Kazanian)		Russia	A member of Palaeostylidae, a species of Palaeostylus.	
Palaeostylus stuckenbergi	Sp. nov	Valid	Mazaev	Permian (Kazanian)		Russia	A member of Palaeostylidae, a species of Palaeostylus.	
Parthenina martae	Sp. nov	Valid	Landau & LaFollette	Miocene	Cantaure Formation	Venezuela	A member of Pyramidellidae, a species of Parthenina.	
Parvulatopsis	Gen. et sp. et comb. nov	Valid	Gründel, Keupp & Lang	Late Jurassic (Kimmeridgian)		France; Germany	A sea snail belonging to the superfamily Neritoidea and the family Parvulatopsidae. The type species is Parvulatopsis quinquecostatus; genus also contains "Nerita" rutyi Guirand & Ogérien (1865).	
Permoconcha minutula	Sp. nov	Valid	Mazaev	Permian (Kazanian)		Russia	A member of Portlockiellidae, a species of Permoconcha.	
Permocossmannina	Gen. et sp. nov	Valid	Mazaev	Permian (Kazanian)		Russia	Possibly a member of Tubiferidae. The type species is Permocossmannina kabanovi.	
Peruvispira canningensis	Sp. nov	Valid	Taboada et al.	Early Permian	Calytrix Formation	Australia	A species of Peruvispira.	
Pileopsella biconvexa	Sp. nov	Valid	Gründel, Keupp & Lang	Late Jurassic (Kimmeridgian)		Germany	A sea snail belonging to the family Pileolidae; a species of Pileopsella.	
Pisanella marieastridae	Nom. nov	Valid	Pacaud, Ledon & Loubry	Eocene		France	A species of Pisanella; a replacement name for "Voluta" fusiformis Defrance (1829) (preoccupied).	
Pisinna stampinensis	Sp. nov	Valid	Lozouet	Oligocene		France	A member of Anabathridae, a species of Pisinna.	
Platyla manganellii	Sp. nov	Valid	Harzhauser, Neubauer & Esu in Harzhauser et al.	Miocene (late Messinian)		Italy	A member of Hydrobiidae, a species of Platyla.	
Plesiotriton aucoini	Sp. nov	Valid	Lesport, Cluzaud & Verhecken	Oligocene (late Rupelian)		France	A member of Cancellariidae belonging to the subfamily Plesiotritoninae, a species of Plesiotriton.	
Plesiotriton cailloelensis	Sp. nov	Valid	Pacaud, Ledon & Loubry	Eocene (Lutetian)	Paris Basin	France	A member of Cancellariidae belonging to the subfamily Plesiotritoninae, a species of Plesiotriton.	
Plesiotriton calciatus	Sp. nov	Valid	Pacaud, Ledon & Loubry	Eocene (Lutetian)	Paris Basin	France	A member of Cancellariidae belonging to the subfamily Plesiotritoninae, a species of Plesiotriton.	
Plesiotriton camiadeorum	Sp. nov	Valid	Lesport, Cluzaud & Verhecken	Oligocene (late Rupelian)		France	A member of Cancellariidae belonging to the subfamily Plesiotritoninae, a species of Plesiotriton.	
Plesiotriton clandestinus	Sp. nov	Valid	Pacaud, Ledon & Loubry	Eocene (Bartonian)	Paris Basin	France	A member of Cancellariidae belonging to the subfamily Plesiotritoninae, a species of Plesiotriton.	
Plesiotriton evanesco	Sp. nov	Valid	Pacaud, Ledon & Loubry	Eocene (Lutetian)	Paris Basin	France	A member of Cancellariidae belonging to the subfamily Plesiotritoninae, a species of Plesiotriton.	
Plesiotriton ganensis	Sp. nov	Valid	Lesport, Cluzaud & Verhecken	Eocene (Ypresian)		France	A member of Cancellariidae belonging to the subfamily Plesiotritoninae, a species of Plesiotriton.	
Plesiotriton jacquesponsi	Sp. nov	Valid	Pacaud, Ledon & Loubry	Eocene (Bartonian)	Paris Basin	France	A member of Cancellariidae belonging to the subfamily Plesiotritoninae, a species of Plesiotriton.	
Plesiotriton teuleraensis	Sp. nov	Valid	Lesport, Cluzaud & Verhecken	Eocene (Ypresian)		France	A member of Cancellariidae belonging to the subfamily Plesiotritoninae, a species of Plesiotriton.	
Pleurofusia paulensis	Sp. nov	Valid	Lozouet	Oligocene		France	A member of Drilliidae, a species of Pleurofusia.	
Pleurofusia pseudocrassinoda	Sp. nov	Valid	Lozouet	Oligocene		France	A member of Drilliidae, a species of Pleurofusia.	
Pleurofusia tauzini	Sp. nov	Valid	Lozouet	Oligocene		France	A member of Drilliidae, a species of Pleurofusia.	
Pleurotomaria bajociana	Sp. nov	Valid	Ferrari & Damborenea	Middle Jurassic (early Bajocian)	Neuquén Basin	Argentina	A member of Pleurotomariidae, a species of Pleurotomaria.	
Pleurotomella eomargaritata	Sp. nov	Valid	Lozouet	Oligocene		France	A species of Pleurotomella.	
Pleurotomella espibosensis	Sp. nov	Valid	Lozouet	Oligocene		France	A species of Pleurotomella.	
Pleurotomella spinosa	Sp. nov	Valid	Lozouet	Oligocene		France	A species of Pleurotomella.	
Popovicia	Nom. nov	Valid	Neubauer & Harzhauser in Neubauer, Harzhauser & Pipík	Late Miocene to Pliocene		Kosovo; Slovakia	A member of Viviparidae; a replacement name for Metohia Popović (1964) (preoccupied). The type species is "Metohia" levantica Popović (1964); genus also contains "Kosovia" compressa Pavlović (1931) and "Metohia" turriculoidea Popović (1964)	
Profundiconus? hennigi	Sp. nov	Valid	Hendricks	Late Miocene	Cercado Formation	Dominican Republic	A member of Conidae, possibly a species of Profundiconus.	
Promathildia? spinosa	Sp. nov	Valid	Ferrari & Damborenea	Middle Jurassic (early Bajocian)	Neuquén Basin	Argentina	A member of Gordenellidae, possibly a species of Promathildia.	
Prososthenia? praeslavonica	Nom. nov	Valid	Mandic et al.	Miocene		Serbia	A member of Hydrobiidae, possibly a species of Prososthenia; a replacement name for Hydrobia slavonica vitrella Brusina (1897) (raised to the rank of a separate species, preoccupied by Hydrobia vitrella Stefanescu, 1896).	
Protocerion	Gen. et comb. nov	Valid	Harasewych et al.	Late Cretaceous (Maastrichtian)	Hell Creek Formation	United States	A probable ancestor of members of the family Cerionidae; a new genus for "Cerion" acherontis Roth & Hartman (1998).	
Pseudamnicola? babindolensis	Nom. nov	Valid	Neubauer et al.	Middle or late Miocene		Macedonia	A member of Hydrobiidae; a replacement name for Pseudamnicola? brusiniana (Pavlović, 1903) (preoccupied).	
Pseudolatirus orthensis	Sp. nov	Valid	Lozouet	Oligocene		France	A species of Pseudolatirus.	
Pseudonerinea jovankae	Sp. nov	Valid	Ayoub-Hannaa et al.	Late Cretaceous (early Cenomanian)		Serbia	A sea snail, a species of Pseudonerinea.	
Ptychalaea mystica	Sp. nov	Valid	Stworzewicz & Pokryszko	Eocene		Europe (Baltic Sea coast)	A species of Ptychalaea known from Baltic amber.	
Purpurina liassica	Sp. nov	Valid	Nützel & Gründel	Early Jurassic (Pliensbachian)	Amaltheenton Formation	Germany		
Pusillina aquensis	Sp. nov	Valid	Lozouet	Oligocene		France	A species of Pusillina.	
Pusillina protocarinata	Sp. nov	Valid	Lozouet	Oligocene		France	A species of Pusillina.	
Pyrgiscus caribbaeus	Sp. nov	Valid	Landau & LaFollette	Miocene	Cantaure Formation	Venezuela	A member of Pyramidellidae, a species of Pyrgiscus.	
Pyrgiscus silvai	Sp. nov	Valid	Landau & LaFollette	Miocene	Cantaure Formation	Venezuela	A member of Pyramidellidae, a species of Pyrgiscus.	
?Pyrgula danielae	Sp. nov	Valid	Girotti in Esu & Girotti	Early Pleistocene	Synania Formation	Greece	Possibly a species of Pyrgula.	
Pyrgula nikosi	Sp. nov	Valid	Esu & Girotti	Early Pleistocene	Synania Formation	Greece	A species of Pyrgula.	
Radix kovaci	Sp. nov	Valid	Neubauer & Harzhauser in Neubauer, Harzhauser & Pipík	Late Miocene	Martin Formation	Slovakia	A member of Lymnaeidae, a species of Radix.	
Retispira chernyshevi	Sp. nov	Valid	Mazaev	Permian (Kazanian)		Russia	A member of Bellerophontidae, a species of Retispira.	
Rhabdocolpus (Infacerithium) excavatus	Sp. nov	Valid	Ferrari & Damborenea	Middle Jurassic (early Bajocian)	Neuquén Basin	Argentina	A member of Procerithiidae, a species of Rhabdocolpus.	
Rimella cazesi	Sp. nov	Valid	Pacaud & Pons	Eocene (Bartonian)		Egypt	A member of Rostellariidae, a species of Rimella.	
Rimella gomezi	Sp. nov	Valid	Pacaud & Pons	Eocene (Bartonian)		Spain	A member of Rostellariidae, a species of Rimella.	
Rimella sandrinae	Sp. nov	Valid	Pacaud & Pons	Eocene (Lutetian)		France	A member of Rostellariidae, a species of Rimella.	
Rissoina chalossensis	Sp. nov	Valid	Lozouet	Oligocene		France	A species of Rissoina.	
Rissoina gerasimovi	Nom. nov	Valid	Faber & Egorov	Middle to Late Jurassic (Callovian to Oxfordian)		Russia	Possibly a species of Rissoina; a replacement name for Rissoina exigua Gerasimov (1992) (preoccupied).	
Royalella aufuga	Sp. nov	Valid	Mazaev	Permian (Kazanian)		Russia	A member of Donaldinidae, a species of Royalella.	
Saccoia globosa	Sp. nov	Valid	Harzhauser, Neubauer & Esu in Harzhauser et al.	Miocene (late Messinian)		Italy	A member of Hydrobiidae, a species of Saccoia.	
Schobertinella	Gen. et sp. nov	Valid	Nützel & Gründel	Early Jurassic (Pliensbachian)	Amaltheenton Formation	Germany	Genus includes new species Schobertinella heterogyrata.	
Socenia antonellae	Sp. nov	Valid	Esu & Girotti	Miocene (early Messinian)	Velona Basin	Italy	A species of Socenia.	
Solariella trivialis	Sp. nov	Valid	Lozouet	Oligocene		France	A species of Solariella.	
Solariorbis oostrombusensis	Sp. nov	Valid	Lozouet	Oligocene		France	A member of Tornidae, a species of Solariorbis.	
Soleniscus netchaevi	Sp. nov	Valid	Mazaev	Permian (Kazanian)		Russia	A member of Soleniscidae, a species of Soleniscus.	
Striatoconulus? trimeuselensis	Sp. nov	Valid	Nützel & Gründel	Early Jurassic (Pliensbachian)	Amaltheenton Formation	Germany		
Strobeus rozeni	Sp. nov	Valid	Mazaev	Permian (Kazanian)		Russia	A member of Soleniscidae, a species of Strobeus.	
Stuckenbergispira	Gen. et sp. et comb. nov	Valid	Mazaev	Permian (Kazanian)		Russia	A member of Platyceratidae. The type species is Stuckenbergispira kazanensis; genus also includes "Capulus" permocarbonicus Stuckenberg (1898).	
Sulcoactaeon sendelbachensis	Sp. nov	Valid	Nützel & Gründel	Early Jurassic (Pliensbachian)	Amaltheenton Formation	Germany		
Taimyroconus	Gen. et sp. nov	Valid	Guzhov & Zakharov	Mesozoic		Russia	A member of Calyptraeidae. The type species is Taimyroconus zakharovi.	
Tessarolax alaskana	Sp. nov	Valid	Saul & Squires	Late Cretaceous (late Turonian to early Coniacian)		United States	A member of Aporrhaidae, a species of Tessarolax.	
Tessarolax bullardi	Sp. nov	Valid	Saul & Squires	Late Cretaceous (middle Coniacian to early Campanian)		Canada; United States	A member of Aporrhaidae, a species of Tessarolax.	
Tessarolax gabbi	Nom. nov	Valid	Saul & Squires	Early Cretaceous (late Hauterivian, possibly also late Barremian)		Canada; United States	A member of Aporrhaidae, a species of Tessarolax; a replacement name for "Helicaulax" bicarinata Gabb (1869).	
Tessarolax grahami	Sp. nov	Valid	Saul & Squires	Late Cretaceous (early Campanian)		Canada; United States	A member of Aporrhaidae, a species of Tessarolax.	
Tessarolax louellae	Sp. nov	Valid	Squires in Saul & Squires	Late Cretaceous (middle late Campanian)		Canada; United States?	A member of Aporrhaidae, a species of Tessarolax.	
Tessarolax teleos	Sp. nov	Valid	Saul & Squires	Late Cretaceous (late early to early late Maastrichtian)	El Piojo Formation; Moreno Formation	United States	A member of Aporrhaidae, a species of Tessarolax.	
Theodoxus patrae	Sp. nov	Valid	Esu & Girotti	Early Pleistocene	Synania Formation	Greece	A species of Theodoxus.	
Tocobaga	Gen. et comb. nov	Valid	Auffenberg, Slapcinsky & Portell	Miocene	Arcadia Formation; St. Marks Formation?	United States	A member of Bulimulidae. A new genus for "Partula" americana Heilprin (1886); genus also contains "Bulimus" floridanus Conrad (1846) and "Bulimulus" americanus wakullae Mansfield (1937) (reranked as a separate species Tocobaga wakullae).	
Tournouerina ronaldi	Sp. nov	Valid	Esu & Girotti	Early Pleistocene	Synania Formation	Greece	A species of Tournouerina.	
Tournouerina turiecensis	Sp. nov	Valid	Neubauer & Harzhauser in Neubauer, Harzhauser & Pipík	Late Miocene	Martin Formation	Slovakia	A member of Hydrobiidae, a species of Tournouerina.	
Tricarilda recta	Sp. nov	Valid	Nützel & Gründel	Early Jurassic (Pliensbachian)	Amaltheenton Formation	Germany		
Tricarilda schoberti	Sp. nov	Valid	Nützel & Gründel	Early Jurassic (Pliensbachian)	Amaltheenton Formation	Germany		
Tripartella neubaueri	Sp. nov	Valid	Nützel & Gründel	Early Jurassic (Pliensbachian)	Amaltheenton Formation	Germany		
Tritonoharpa aquitaniensis	Sp. nov	Valid	Lesport, Cluzaud & Verhecken	Miocene (early Burdigalian)		France	A member of Cancellariidae belonging to the subfamily Plesiotritoninae, a species of Tritonoharpa.	
Tritonoharpa caunbonensis	Sp. nov	Valid	Pacaud, Ledon & Loubry	Eocene (Bartonian)		France	A member of Cancellariidae belonging to the subfamily Plesiotritoninae, a species of Tritonoharpa.	
Tritonoharpa mariechristinae	Sp. nov	Valid	Lesport, Cluzaud & Verhecken	Miocene (Langhian)		France	A member of Cancellariidae belonging to the subfamily Plesiotritoninae, a species of Tritonoharpa.	
Tritonoharpa renardi	Sp. nov	Valid	Lesport, Cluzaud & Verhecken	Miocene (Serravallian)		France	A member of Cancellariidae belonging to the subfamily Plesiotritoninae, a species of Tritonoharpa.	
Trivia merlini	Sp. nov	Disputed	Fehse & Van de Haar	Pliocene-Pleistocene		Belgium	A species of Trivia. Van Nieulande et al. (2022) considered it to be a junior synonym of Trivia monacha (da Costa, 1778).	
Trochotoma (Placotoma)	Nom. nov et sp. nov	Valid	Ferrari et al.	Jurassic (Pliensbachian to Kimmeridgian)	Piedra Pintada Formation	Argentina; France; Germany	A member of Trochotomidae, a subgenus of Trochotoma; a replacement name for Discotoma Haber (1934). The type species of the subgenus is "Ditremaria" amata d’Orbigny (1850); the subgenus also includes new species Trochotoma (Placotoma) neuquensis, as well as "Ditremaria" suevica Quenstedt (1881–84). Considered to be a separate genus by Gründel, Keupp & Lang (2017).	
Trochotoma (Trochotoma) protonotialis	Sp. nov	Valid	Ferrari et al.	Early Jurassic (Pliensbachian)	Piedra Pintada Formation	Argentina	A member of Trochotomidae, a species of Trochotoma.	
Tryonia hershleri	Sp. nov	Valid	Czaja & Estrada-Rodríguez	Late Pleistocene		Mexico	A species of Tryonia.	
Tryonia pseudocircumstriata	Sp. nov	Valid	Czaja & Estrada-Rodríguez	Late Pleistocene		Mexico	A species of Tryonia.	
Turbonilla paraguanensis	Sp. nov	Valid	Landau & LaFollette	Miocene	Cantaure Formation	Venezuela	A member of Pyramidellidae, a species of Turbonilla.	
Tylostoma ranchariensis	Sp. nov	Valid	Pereira et al.	Early Cretaceous (Aptian-Albian)	Romualdo Formation	Brazil	A member of Naticidae, a species of Tylostoma.	
Unitas ponsi	Sp. nov	Valid	Lozouet	Oligocene		France	A member of Cancellariidae, a species of Unitas.	
Valvata ducati	Sp. nov	Valid	Esu & Girotti	Pleistocene		Italy	A species of Valvata.	
Valvata pyramidula	Sp. nov	Valid	Esu & Girotti	Early Pleistocene	Synania Formation	Greece	A species of Valvata.	
Viviparus codomorphus	Sp. nov	Valid	Hartman	Paleocene (Torrejonian)	Fort Union Formation	United States	A species of Viviparus.	
Viviparus kochanskyae	Sp. nov	Valid	Mandic et al.	Pliocene		Croatia; Serbia	A species of Viviparus.	
Viviparus pipiki	Sp. nov	Valid	Neubauer & Harzhauser in Neubauer, Harzhauser & Pipík	Late Miocene	Martin Formation	Slovakia	A member of Viviparidae, a species of Viviparus.	
Viviparus purgatorius	Sp. nov	Valid	Hartman	Paleocene (Puercan to Torrejonian)	Fort Union Formation; Ravenscrag Formation	Canada; United States	A species of Viviparus.	
Wallowiella (Plicaropsis)	Subgen. et comb. et sp. nov	Valid	Gründel, Keupp & Lang	Late Jurassic (Kimmeridgian)		Germany	A sea snail belonging to the family Neritopsidae; a subgenus of Wallowiella. The type species is "Neritites" cancellatus Stahl (1824); the subgenus also contains new species Wallowiella (Plicaropsis) compacta.	
Zebina bespiso	Sp. nov	Valid	Lozouet	Oligocene		France	A species of Zebina.	
Zebina sarcignanensis	Sp. nov	Valid	Lozouet	Oligocene		France	A species of Zebina.	

== Other molluscs ==
Name	Novelty	Status	Authors	Age	Unit	Location	Notes	Images
Admytilus	Gen. et sp. nov	Valid	Berezovsky	Eocene		Ukraine	A bivalve belonging to the family Mytilidae. The type species is Admytilus alius.	
Adrarunio	Gen. et comb. nov	Valid	Van Damme & Bogan in Van Damme, Bogan & Dierick	Jurassic	Irhazer Group	Niger	A bivalve belonging to the family Nakamuranaiadidae; a new genus for "Unio" deserticus Mongin (1968).	
Afrohyrioides	Gen. et comb. nov	Valid	Van Damme & Bogan in Van Damme, Bogan & Dierick	Jurassic		Egypt; Niger	A bivalve belonging to the family Unionidae; a new genus for "Unio" jowikolensis Newton (1909).	
Anechinocardium	Gen. et comb. nov	Valid	Hickman	Late Eocene to Oligocene	Eugene Formation; Keasey Formation; Pittsburg Bluff Formation	United States	A cockle. The type species is "Cardium" weaveri Anderson & Martin (1914); genus also includes "Nemocardium" formosum Hickman (1969) and "Cardium" lorenzanum Arnold (1908).	
Aphanaia kletzi	Sp. nov	Valid	Biakov & Kutygin	Permian (late Sakmarian)		Russia	A bivalve, a species of Aphanaia.	
Arcopsis (Arcopsis) tenuicostata	Sp. nov	Valid	Berezovsky	Late Eocene	Mandrikovka Beds	Ukraine	A bivalve, a species of Arcopsis.	
Assytilus	Gen. et sp. nov	Valid	Berezovsky	Eocene		Ukraine	A bivalve belonging to the family Mytilidae. The type species is Assytilus alpha.	
Astartella heideckeri	Sp. nov	Valid	Waterhouse	Permian	Tiverton Formation	Australia	An astartid bivalve.	
Astartella? stefaniae	Sp. nov	Valid	Hautmann in Hautmann et al.	Early Triassic		China	An astartid bivalve, possibly a species of Astartella.	
Auroradiolites	Gen. et comb. nov	Valid	Rao et al.	Early Cretaceous (Aptian to Albian)		Afghanistan; China; India; Iran; Japan; Pakistan	A radiolitid rudist. A new genus for "Praeradiolites" gilgitensis Douvillé (1926); genus also contains "Sphaerulites" griesbachi Douvillé (1926) and "Praeradiolites" biconvexus Yang et al. (1982).	
Bacatigonia	Gen. et comb. nov	Valid	Cooper	Early Cretaceous (Albian)		Belgium; Kazakhstan	A bivalve belonging to the family Pterotrigoniidae. The type species is "Linotrigonia (Oistotrigonia)" immutata Savel’ev (1958); genus also includes B. dzharmanensis (Vinokurova in Vinokurova & Romanovskaja, 1972), B. kajragatshensis (Vinokurova in Vinokurova & Romanovskaja, 1972), B. ludovicae (Briart & Cornet, 1868) and B. tshuenkoi (Romanovskaja & Vinokurova in Vinokurova & Romanovskaja, 1972).	
Bakulia	Gen. et 2 sp. nov	Valid	Silantiev & Chandra in Silantiev, Chandra & Urazaeva	Permian	Raniganj Formation	India	A bivalve belonging to the family Senderzoniellidae. The type species is Bakulia damodarensis; genus also includes Bakulia jhamuniaensis.	
Balaklavella	Gen. et comb. nov	Valid	Cooper	Early Cretaceous		Crimean Peninsula	A bivalve belonging to the family Rutitrigoniidae. The type species is "Rutitrigonia" balaklavensis Yanin (2004).	
Barbatia (Barbatia) soluta	Sp. nov	Valid	Berezovsky	Late Eocene	Mandrikovka Beds	Ukraine	A bivalve, a species of Barbatia.	
Bentharca steffeni	Sp. nov	Valid	Amano, Jenkins & Nishida	Paleocene	Katsuhira Formation	Japan	An ark clam, a species of Bentharca.	
Bicorbula kutchensis	Sp. nov	Valid	Halder & Bano	Paleogene		India	A bivalve belonging to the family Corbulidae.	
Brachidontes araripensis	Sp. nov	Valid	Pereira et al.	Early Cretaceous (Aptian-Albian)	Romualdo Formation	Brazil	A bivalve belonging to the family Mytilidae, a species of Brachidontes.	
Caestocorbula gujaratensis	Sp. nov	Valid	Halder & Bano	Paleogene		India	A bivalve belonging to the family Corbulidae.	
Callistochiton borellianus	Sp. nov	Valid	Dell’Angelo et al.	Miocene (Messinian)		Italy	A chiton belonging to the family Callistoplacidae, a species of Callistochiton.	
Circunula	Gen. et comb. nov	Valid	Koppka	Late Jurassic		Russia; Czech Republic; France; Germany; Poland; Switzerland	A foam oyster; a new genus for "Ostrea" cotyledon Contejean (1859).	
Coactunio	Gen. et comb. nov	Valid	Van Damme & Bogan in Van Damme, Bogan & Dierick	Middle or Late Jurassic	Irhazer Group	Niger	A bivalve belonging to the family Unionidae; a new genus for ?"Chamberlainia" iguallalensis Mongin (1963).	
Conchocele bathyaulax	Sp. nov	Valid	Hickman	Late Eocene to early Oligocene	Keasey Formation	United States	A bivalve belonging to the family Thyasiridae, a species of Conchocele.	
Conchocele taylori	Sp. nov	Valid	Hickman	Late Eocene	Keasey Formation	United States	A bivalve belonging to the family Thyasiridae, a species of Conchocele.	
Cosmetopsis glimmerodensis	Sp. nov	Valid	Janssen	Oligocene	Kassel Formation	Germany	A limopsid bivalve, a species of Cosmetopsis.	
Cosmetopsis latdorfensis	Sp. nov	Valid	Janssen	Oligocene		Belgium; Germany	A limopsid bivalve, a species of Cosmetopsis.	
Cosmetopsis mothsorum	Sp. nov	Valid	Janssen	Oligocene		Germany	A limopsid bivalve, a species of Cosmetopsis.	
Cyclocardia moniligena	Sp. nov	Valid	Hickman	Eocene-Oligocene boundary	Keasey Formation	United States	A bivalve, a species of Cyclocardia.	
Earlpackardia	Gen. et comb. nov	Valid	Cooper	Cretaceous		Japan; Philippines; United States (Oregon)	A bivalve belonging to the family Rutitrigoniidae. The type species is "Trigonia" jacksonensis Packard (1921); genus also includes E. yeharai (Kobayashi, 1954) and E. amagensis (Kobayashi, 1957).	
Elianella	Gen. et comb. nov	Junior homonym	Cooper	Late Cretaceous (Maastrichtian)		Madagascar	A bivalve belonging to the family Rutitrigoniidae. The type species is "Trigonia" patonensis Basse (1931); genus also includes E. gilleti (Basse, 1932). The generic name is preoccupied by Elianella Vercammen-Grandjean (1956); Ceccolini & Cianferoni (2021) coined a replacement name Elianegonia.	
Elrhazunio	Gen. et sp. nov	Valid	Van Damme & Bogan in Van Damme, Bogan & Dierick	Early Cretaceous (Aptian or Albian)	Elrhaz Formation	Niger	A bivalve which might be a member of the family Unionidae or the family Margaritiferidae. The type species is Elrhazunio problematica.	
Enigmaconus? pyramidalis	Sp. nov	Valid	Kouchinsky & Vendrasco in Kouchinsky et al.	Early Cambrian	Emyaksin Formation	Russia	A mollusc of uncertain phylogenetic placement, possibly a monoplacophoran; an enigmaconid, possibly a species of Enigmaconus.	
Erichlangeia	Gen. et comb. nov	Valid	Cooper	Late Jurassic (Kimmeridgian)		Tanzania	A bivalve belonging to the family Rutitrigoniidae. The type species is "Trigonia" dietrichi Lange (1914).	
Etheripecten playfordi	Sp. nov	Valid	Waterhouse	Permian	Tiverton Formation	Australia	A bivalve belonging to the family Heteropectinidae.	
Eufalagonia	Gen. et comb. nov	Valid	Cooper	Late Cretaceous (Maastrichtian)		United States (Alabama)	A bivalve belonging to the family Pterotrigoniidae. Genus includes "Trigonia" angulicostata Gabb (1876).	
Eurotrigonia	Gen. et comb. nov	Valid	Cooper	Early Cretaceous (Berriasian-Aptian)		Kazakhstan; Russia; Turkmenistan; United Kingdom	A bivalve belonging to the family Pterotrigoniidae. The type species is "Pterotrigonia" mantelli Casey (1962); genus also includes E. akuschaensis (Anthula, 1899), E. aliformis (Parkinson, 1811), E. anterior (Casey, 1962), E. attenuata (Lycett, 1875), E. caudata (Agassiz, 1840), E. crassicostata (van Hoepen, 1929), E. cubanica (Sinzow, 1913), E. cuneiformis (Conrad, 1852), E. druzczici (Yanin, 2004), E. gokderensis (Savel’ev, 1958), E? hemilunaris (Savel’ev, 1958), E. hungarica (Bockh, 1910), E. kopetdagensis (Aliev & Aliev, 1961), E. percaudata (Rollier, 1913), E. schapsugensis (Mordvilko, 1932), E. subaliformis (Savel’ev, 1958), E. subpiriformis (Savel’ev, 1958) and E. vectiana (Lycett, 1875).	
Eurydesma glaebula	Sp. nov	Valid	Waterhouse	Permian	Tiverton Formation	Australia	A bivalve belonging to the group Pectinida and the family Eurydesmidae.	
Gabbigonia	Gen. et comb. nov	Valid	Cooper	Late Cretaceous (Campanian)		United States	A bivalve belonging to the family Pterotrigoniidae. The type species is "Trigonia" eufalensis Gabb (1860); genus also includes G. gabbi (Stephenson, 1941), G. kummeli (Weller, 1907), G. moorei (Stephenson, 1941), and G. marionensis (Stephenson, 1923).	
Gangamya	Gen. et 3 sp. nov	Valid	Silantiev & Chandra in Silantiev, Chandra & Urazaeva	Permian	Damuda Group	India	A bivalve belonging to the family Prokopievskiidae. The type species is Gangamya minutula; genus also includes Gangamya elongata and Gangamya jhariaensis.	
Gastrochaena beringiana	Sp. nov	Valid	Kalishevich	Paleogene		Russia	A bivalve, a species of Gastrochaena.	
Glycymeris (Glycymeris) dimicostata	Sp. nov	Valid	Berezovsky	Late Eocene	Mandrikovka Beds	Ukraine	A bivalve, a species of Glycymeris.	
Glycymeris (Glycymeris) eos	Sp. nov	Valid	Berezovsky	Late Eocene	Mandrikovka Beds	Ukraine	A bivalve, a species of Glycymeris.	
Glycymeris (Glycymeris) indefinita	Sp. nov	Valid	Berezovsky	Late Eocene	Mandrikovka Beds	Ukraine	A bivalve, a species of Glycymeris.	
Glycymeris (Glycymeris) insentira	Sp. nov	Valid	Berezovsky	Late Eocene	Mandrikovka Beds	Ukraine	A bivalve, a species of Glycymeris.	
Glycymeris (Glycymeris) manitesta	Sp. nov	Valid	Berezovsky	Late Eocene	Mandrikovka Beds	Ukraine	A bivalve, a species of Glycymeris.	
Glycymeris (Glycymeris) parma	Sp. nov	Valid	Berezovsky	Late Eocene	Mandrikovka Beds	Ukraine	A bivalve, a species of Glycymeris.	
Gondwanadontella	Gen. et sp. nov	Valid	Silantiev & Chandra in Silantiev, Chandra & Urazaeva	Permian	Raniganj Formation	India	A bivalve belonging to the family Anadontellidae. The type species is Gondwanadontella indiana.	
Gondwanaiadites	Gen. et 2 sp. nov	Valid	Silantiev & Chandra in Silantiev, Chandra & Urazaeva	Permian	Raniganj Formation	India	A bivalve belonging to the family Naiaditidae. The type species is Gondwanaiadites betekhtinae; genus also includes Gondwanaiadites angustata.	
Grandigonia	Gen. et comb. nov	Valid	Cooper	Early Cretaceous (Hauterivian)		France; United Kingdom	A bivalve belonging to the family Iotrigoniidae. The type species is "Trigonia" robinaldina d'Orbigny (1844).	
Haumurigonia	Gen. et comb. nov	Valid	Cooper	Late Cretaceous (Campanian-Maastrichtian)		Antarctica; Argentina; Chile; New Zealand	A bivalve belonging to the family Pterotrigoniidae. The type species is "Trigonia" pseudocaudata Hector (1886); genus also includes H. bastamantina (Feruglio, 1935), H. dumbeae (Freneix, 1958), H. malagninoi (Medina, 1980), H. spikermanni (Medina, 1980), H. waitangiensis (Fleming, 1987) and H. windhauseniana (Wilckens, 1921).	
Helvetostrea	Gen. et comb. nov	Valid	Koppka	Middle? to Late Jurassic		Switzerland; Germany? Poland? United Kingdom?	A flemingostreid oyster; a new genus for "Ostrea" sequana Thurmann & Etallon (1862). Genus might also contain "Ostrea" caprina Rollier (1917), "Ostrea" oxfordiana Rollier (1917) and "Ostrea" expansa Sowerby (1819).	
Henrywoodsia	Gen. et comb. nov	Valid	Cooper	Late Cretaceous (Campanian-Maastrichtian)		New Zealand	A bivalve belonging to the family Pterotrigoniidae. The type species is "Trigonia" waiparensis Woods (1917); genus also includes H. ongleyi (Fleming, 1987) and H. pygoscelium (Wilckens, 1910).	
Illyricocongeria	Gen. et comb. et sp. nov		Mandic in Neubauer, Mandic & Harzhauser	Miocene		Bosnia and Herzegovina; Croatia	A member of Dreissenidae. The type species is "Congeria" aletici Brusina (1907); genus also includes Illyricocongeria acuta (Kochansky-Devidé in Kochansky-Devidé & Slišković, 1981), I. avis (Kochansky-Devidé in Kochansky-Devidé & Slišković, 1981), I. bosniaca (Katzer, 1913), I. bosniaca acuticostata (Kochansky-Devidé in Kochansky-Devidé & Slišković, 1981), I. clivunensis (Kochansky-Devidé in Kochansky-Devidé & Slišković, 1981), I. cor (Kochansky-Devidé in KochanskyDevidé & Slišković, 1978), I. cvitanovici (Brusina, 1907), I. dalmatica (Brusina, 1874), I. drvarensis (Toula, 1913), I. frici (Brusina, 1904), I. fuchsi (Pilar, 1873), I. katzeri (Kochansky-Devidé in Kochansky-Devidé & Slišković, 1978), I. novica (Kochansky-Devidé in Kochansky-Devidé & Slišković, 1978), I. obliqua (Kochansky-Devidé in Kochansky-Devidé & Slišković, 1978), I. pernaeformis (Andrusov, 1897), I. pikijae (Kochansky-Devidé, 1979), I. scaphula (Brusina in Andrusov, 1897), I. stojcicae (Kochansky-Devidé in Kochansky-Devidé & Slišković, 1978), I. volucris (Kochansky-Devidé in Kochansky-Devidé & Slišković, 1978), as well as new species Illyricocongeria moirae and possibly also I.? soklici (Kochansky-Devidé in Kochansky-Devidé & Slišković, 1978).	
Incomatiella	Gen. et comb. nov	Valid	Cooper	Cretaceous (?Albian-Maastrichtian)		Mozambique; Crimean Peninsula?	A bivalve belonging to the family Pterotrigoniidae. The type species is "Trigonia (Scabrotrigonia)" incomatensis Rennie (1936); genus also includes I. chivensis (Arkhanguelsky, 1916) and possibly I? taurica (Yanin, 2004).	
Indonellina	Gen. et 2 sp. nov	Valid	Silantiev & Chandra in Silantiev, Chandra & Urazaeva	Permian	Raniganj Formation	India	A bivalve belonging to the family Prokopievskiidae. The type species is Indonellina triangulata; genus also includes Indonellina orbiculata.	
Jaitlygonia	Gen. et comb. nov	Valid	Cooper	Late Cretaceous (Maastrichtian)		India	A bivalve belonging to the family Rutitrigoniidae. The type species is "Trigonia" suborbicularis Forbes (1845); genus also includes J. indica (Stoliczka, 1871) and J. orientalis (Forbes, 1845).	
Kauffmanella	Gen. et comb. nov	Valid	Cooper	Late Cretaceous (Campanian-Maastrichtian)		United States	A bivalve belonging to the family Pterotrigoniidae. The type species is "Trigonia" haynensis Stephenson (1923); genus also includes K. cerulea (Whitfield, 1885).	
Kellia saxiriva	Sp. nov	Valid	Hickman	Eocene-Oligocene boundary	Keasey Formation	United States	A bivalve belonging to the family Lasaeidae, a species of Kellia.	
Kellia vokesi	Sp. nov	Valid	Hickman	Eocene-Oligocene boundary	Keasey Formation	United States	A bivalve belonging to the family Lasaeidae, a species of Kellia.	
Leanzatrigonia	Gen. et comb. nov	Valid	Cooper	Cretaceous		Argentina	A bivalve belonging to the family Pterotrigoniidae. The type species is "Trigonia" coihuicoensis Weaver (1931).	
Lepidochitona gantensis	Sp. nov	Valid	Dell’Angelo et al.	Eocene (?late Lutetian to early Bartonian)	Kincses Formation	Hungary	A chiton, a species of Lepidochitona.	
Lepidochitona szoetsi	Sp. nov	Valid	Dell’Angelo et al.	Eocene (?late Lutetian to early Bartonian)	Kincses Formation	Hungary	A chiton, a species of Lepidochitona.	
Lepidochitona viciani	Sp. nov	Valid	Dell’Angelo et al.	Eocene (?late Lutetian to early Bartonian)	Kincses Formation	Hungary	A chiton, a species of Lepidochitona.	
Leptochiton lignatilis	Sp. nov	Valid	Dell’Angelo, Bertolaso & Sosso in Bertolaso et al.	Miocene (Langhian to Tortonian)	Termina Formation	Italy	A chiton belonging to the family Leptochitonidae, a species of Leptochiton.	
Levytrigonia	Gen. et comb. nov	Valid	Cooper	Middle Jurassic		Argentina	A bivalve belonging to the family Iotrigoniidae. The type species is "Trigonia" covuncoensis Lambert (1944).	
Limopsis indubia	Sp. nov	Valid	Berezovsky	Late Eocene		Ukraine	A bivalve belonging to the family Limopsidae, a species of Limopsis.	
Limopsis lacunosa	Sp. nov	Valid	Berezovsky	Late Eocene		Ukraine	A bivalve belonging to the family Limopsidae, a species of Limopsis.	
Limopsis obscura	Sp. nov	Valid	Berezovsky	Late Eocene		Ukraine	A bivalve belonging to the family Limopsidae, a species of Limopsis.	
Limopsis pretiosa	Sp. nov	Valid	Berezovsky	Late Eocene		Ukraine	A bivalve belonging to the family Limopsidae, a species of Limopsis.	
Limopsis quadrata	Sp. nov	Valid	Berezovsky	Late Eocene		Ukraine	A bivalve belonging to the family Limopsidae, a species of Limopsis.	
Lycettitrigonia	Gen. et comb. nov	Valid	Cooper	Late Jurassic (Kimmeridgian) to Late Cretaceous (Cenomanian)		Egypt; France; India; Libya; Switzerland; United Kingdom; Jordan? United States?	A bivalve belonging to the family Rutitrigoniidae. The type species is "Trigonia" excentrica Parkinson (1811); genus also includes L. affinis (Sowerby, 1818), L? analoga (Douvillé, 1916), L. beyrichi (Krumbeck, 1906), L. boloniensis (de Loriol, 1866), L. coquandiana (d'Orbigny, 1844), L. costatissima (Petter Receveur, 1955), L. debilis (Lycett, 1877), L? depauperata (Douvillé, 1916), L. dunscombensis (Lycett, 1877), L. laeviuscula (Lycett, 1875), L? lerchi (Hill, 1893), L. longa (Agassiz, 1840), L. pseudoexcentrica (von Hoppe, 1922), L. sanctaecrucis (Pictet & Campiche, 1866), L. semiculta (Forbes, 1845) and L? undulaptoplicata (Blanckenhorn, 1890).	
Mackinnonia puppis	Sp. nov	Valid	Høyberget et al.	Early Cambrian	Ringstrand Formation	Norway	A helcionellid, a species of Mackinnonia.	
Magallanesia rutogensis	Sp. nov	Valid	Rao et al.	Early Cretaceous (Albian)	Langshan Formation	China	A polyconitid rudist, a species of Magallanesia.	
Makarenkoplax	Gen. et comb. nov	Valid	Sirenko & Dell’Angelo	Late Paleocene and Early Eocene	Luzanovka Beds; Mandrikovka Beds	Ukraine	A chiton belonging to the group Chitonida and the superfamily Cryptoplacoidea. The type species is "Lepidochiton" vjalovi Makarenko (1969); genus also includes "Lepidochiton" menneri Makarenko (1969).	
Mangyschlakella	Gen. et comb. nov	Valid	Cooper	Cretaceous (Aptian-Cenomanian)		Belgium; Kazakhstan; Russia; United Kingdom	A bivalve belonging to the family Pterotrigoniidae. The type species is "Pterotrigonia" tatianae Savel’ev (1958); genus also includes M. elisae (Briart & Cornet, 1868), M. hemilunaris (Savel’ev, 1958), M. klytschevae (Savel’ev, 1958) and M. piriformis (Mordvilko, 1932).	
Mayesella	Gen. et comb. nov	Valid	Cooper	Late Jurassic and Early Cretaceous		Antarctica; Argentina; India; Kazakhstan; South Africa; Tanzania	A bivalve belonging to the family Iotrigoniidae. The type species is "Trigonia (Iotrigonia)" haughtoni Rennie (1936); genus also includes M. dubia (Kitchin, 1903), M. falcki (Rouillier & Vosinsky, 1849), M. feruglioi (Medina 1987), M. heterosculpta (Stanton, 1901), M. jakshysaurensis (Luppov, 1932), M. kuehni (Müller, 1900), M. recurva (Kitchin, 1903) and M. vau (Sharpe, 1856).	
Mediata xixiangensis	Sp. nov	Valid	Shao et al.	Cambrian		China	A member of the family Maikhanellidae.	
Merismopteria cona	Sp. nov	Valid	Waterhouse	Permian	Tiverton Formation	Australia	A bivalve belonging to the family Pterineidae.	
Moerella quasimacoma	Sp. nov	Valid	Hickman	Late Eocene to early Oligocene	Keasey Formation	United States	A bivalve belonging to the family Tellinidae, a species of Moerella.	
Musagonia	Gen. et comb. nov	Valid	Cooper	Late Cretaceous (Coniacian)		United States (California)	A bivalve belonging to the family Pterotrigoniidae. The type species is "Trigonia" bowersiana Anderson (1958).	
Noelmorrisia	Gen. et comb. nov	Valid	Cooper	Cretaceous (Aptian-Cenomanian)		France; Kazakhstan	A bivalve belonging to the family Pterotrigoniidae. The type species is "Trigonia" fittoni Deshayes in Leymerie (1842); genus also includes N. danovi (Savel’ev, 1958), N. laeviarealis (Savel’ev, 1958), N. meyeri (Lycett, 1875) and possibly N? ninae (Savel’ev, 1958) and N? ornata (d’Orbigny, 1844).	
Nucinella capsa	Sp. nov	Valid	Berezovsky	Late Eocene	Mandrikovka Beds	Ukraine	A bivalve, a species of Nucinella.	
Nucinella explicata	Sp. nov	Valid	Berezovsky	Late Eocene	Mandrikovka Beds	Ukraine	A bivalve, a species of Nucinella.	
Nucinella similis	Sp. nov	Valid	Berezovsky	Late Eocene	Mandrikovka Beds	Ukraine	A bivalve, a species of Nucinella.	
Offneria prebetica	Sp. nov	Valid	Masse et al.	Early Cretaceous (early Aptian)		Spain	A caprinid rudist, a species of Offneria.	
Orbiculipecten cokeri	Sp. nov	Valid	Waterhouse	Permian	Tiverton Formation	Australia	A bivalve belonging to the family Streblochondriidae.	
Orbigonina	Gen. et comb. nov	Valid	Cooper	Late Cretaceous (Turonian-Maastrichtian)		Antarctica; Australia; New Caledonia; New Zealand; South Africa	A bivalve belonging to the family Pterotrigoniidae. The type species is "Trigonia" antarctica Wilckens (1910); genus also includes O. austronana (Stilwell & Gallagher, 2009), O. piripauana (Fleming, 1987) and O. saunali (Freneix, 1958).	
Parachiton statianus	Sp. nov	Valid	Dell’Angelo et al.	Miocene (Tortonian) and Pliocene		Italy; Spain	A chiton belonging to the family Leptochitonidae, a species of Parachiton.	
Paracratis magdeburgensis	Sp. nov	Valid	Janssen	Oligocene		Germany	A limopsid bivalve, a species of Paracratis.	
Paracratis muelleri	Sp. nov	Valid	Janssen	Oligocene		Germany	A limopsid bivalve, a species of Paracratis.	
Paraheudeana soudanensis	Sp. nov	Valid	Van Damme & Bogan in Van Damme, Bogan & Dierick	Middle or Late Jurassic	Irhazer Group	Niger	A bivalve belonging to the family Margaritiferidae. Originally described as a species of Paraheudeana; Lopes-Lima et al. (2018) transferred this species to the genus Asturianaia.	
Parainoceramya	Gen. et comb. nov	Valid	Ros-Franch et al.	Hettangian to Tithonian-Berriasian		Argentina; France; Germany; New Zealand; Russia; United Kingdom; China? Hungary? India? Italy? Japan? Turkey?	A bivalve belonging to the group Myalinida and possibly to the family Inoceramidae. The type species is "Crenatula" ventricosa de C. Sowerby (1823); genus also includes several other species formerly assigned to the genus Parainoceramus.	
Pelecyogyra	Gen. et sp. nov	Valid	Ebbestad & Lefebvre	Ordovician (Tremadocian)	Fezouata Formation	Morocco	A member of Onychochilidae (a group of molluscs of uncertain phylogenetic placement, possibly gastropods). The type species is Pelecyogyra fezouataensis.	
Perezella	Gen. et comb. nov	Junior homonym	Cooper	Middle Jurassic		Chile	A bivalve belonging to the family Iotrigoniidae. The type species is "Vaugonia" fuenzalidai Reyes & Pérez (1984); genus also includes P. lissocostata (Reyes & Pérez, 1984). The generic name is preoccupied by Perezella Cépède (1910); Ceccolini & Cianferoni (2021) coined a replacement name Perezigonia.	
Praescabrotrigonia	Gen. et comb. et nom. nov	Valid	Cooper	Cretaceous (Albian-Maastrichtian)		Egypt; Jamaica; Morocco; Peru; United Kingdom; United States	A bivalve belonging to the family Pterotrigoniidae. The type species is "Trigonia" emoryi Conrad (1857); genus also includes P bartrami (Stephenson, 1923), P. clavigera (Cragin, 1893), P. crenulata (Lamarck, 1819), P. crenulifera (Lycett, 1877), P. douvillei (El Din, 1955), P. emoryoides (Trechmann, 1927), P. hottingeri (Freneix, 1972), P? larteti (Munier-Chalmas in litt., Mengaud 1920) and P. mooreana (Gabb, 1861), as well as P. olssoni (a replacement name for Trigonia (Scabrotrigonia) gerthi Olsson, 1944).	
Primaspina banksi	Sp. nov	Valid	Waterhouse	Permian	Tiverton Formation	Australia	A bivalve belonging to the family Heteropectinidae.	
Protraxia	Gen. et comb. nov	Valid	Waterhouse	Permian	Farley Formation	Australia	A bivalve belonging to family Pachydomidae. The type species is "Cardiomorpha" gryphoides de Koninck (1877); genus also includes "Edmondia" nobilissimus de Koninck (1876).	
Pseudomyalina perquiritus	Sp. nov	Valid	Waterhouse	Permian	Tiverton Formation	Australia	A bivalve belonging to the superfamily Ambonychioidea and the family Myalinidae.	
Pterotegulaedon	Gen. et comb. nov	Valid	Van Damme & Bogan in Van Damme, Bogan & Dierick	Early Cretaceous (Aptian or Albian)	Elrhaz Formation	Niger	An unionid bivalve belonging to the family Tegulaedontidae. A new genus for "Hyriopsis" nigeriensis Mongin (1968). Genus might also contain Hyriopsis nigeriensis forme tortuosa Mongin (1968) (reranked as a separate species ?Pterotegulaedon tortuosa), thought this species might belong to the family Unionidae or Margaritiferidae instead.	
Pterotrigonioides	Gen. et comb. nov	Valid	Cooper	Early Cretaceous (?Berriasian-Hauterivian)		Chile; South Africa	A bivalve belonging to the family Pterotrigoniidae. The type species is "Trigonia" rogersi Kitchin (1908); genus also includes P. savagei (Cooper, 1979).	
Raniganjelia	Gen. et sp. nov	Valid	Silantiev & Chandra in Silantiev, Chandra & Urazaeva	Permian	Raniganj Formation	India	A bivalve belonging to the family Prokopievskiidae. The type species is Raniganjelia prolixa.	
Renatoreyesia	Gen. et comb. nov	Valid	Cooper	Late Jurassic		Chile	A bivalve belonging to the family Pterotrigoniidae. The type species is "Linotrigonia (Oistotrigonia?) chongi Pérez and Reyes (1985).	
Ribeiria johni	Sp. nov	Valid	Polechová	Ordovician (late Katian)	Králův Dvůr Formation	Czech Republic	A ribeirioid rostroconch, a species of Ribeiria.	
Rostrunio	Gen. et comb. nov	Valid	Van Damme & Bogan in Van Damme, Bogan & Dierick	Middle or Late Jurassic	Irhazer Group	Niger	A bivalve belonging to the family Unionidae; a new genus for "Unio" lapparenti Mongin (1963).	
Saxicavella burnsi	Sp. nov	Valid	Hickman	Late Eocene	Keasey Formation	United States	A bivalve belonging to the family Basteroteiidae, a species of Saxicavella.	
Stutchburia laminata	Sp. nov	Valid	Waterhouse	Permian	Tiverton Formation	Australia	A bivalve belonging to the group Cardiida and the family Kalenteridae.	
Tamaragonia	Gen. et comb. nov	Valid	Cooper	Early Cretaceous (Berriasian-Aptian), possibly also Late Jurassic		France; Poland; Russia; Switzerland; United Kingdom	A bivalve belonging to the family Iotrigoniidae. The type species is "Trigonia" abichi Anthula (1899); genus also includes T? hauchecornei (Schmidt, 1905), T. naltschikensis (Mordvilko, 1949), T. scaphae (Agassiz, 1840), T? sequenzai (Trevisan, 1937) and T. transcaspiae (Savel’ev, 1958).	
Tamesnelloides	Gen. et sp. nov	Valid	Van Damme & Bogan in Van Damme, Bogan & Dierick	Middle or Late Jurassic	Irhazer Group	Niger	An unionid bivalve belonging to the family Tamesnellidae. The type species is Tamesnelloides lithoides.	
Tamuragonia	Gen. et comb. nov	Valid	Cooper	Cretaceous (?Valanginian-Cenomanian)		Japan; New Zealand?	A bivalve belonging to the family Pterotrigoniidae. The type species is "Trigonia" ogawai Yehara (1923); genus also includes T. amakusensis (Tashiro & Matsuda, 1983), T. brevicula (Yehara, 1915), T. dilapsa (Yehara, 1923), T. higoensis (Tamura & Tashiro, 1967), T. mashikensis (Tamura & Tashiro 1967), T. mifunensis (Tamura & Tashiro, 1967), T. miyanoharensis (Tashiro & Matsuda, 1983), T. tamurai (Tashiro & Matsuda, 1983), T. tanakai (Tashiro & Matsuda, 1986), T? ultima (Fleming 1987), and T. usuiensis (Tashiro & Matsuda, 1983).	
Tanzanitrigonia	Gen. et comb. nov	Valid	Cooper	Late Jurassic and Early Cretaceous		Argentina; Madagascar; Somalia; Tanzania; United States (Arizona)	A bivalve belonging to the family Rutitrigoniidae. The type species is "Trigonia" schwarzi Müller (1900); genus also includes "Trigonia" agrioensis Weaver (1931), "Trigonia" niongalensis Lange (1914), "Trigonia" nossae Aitken (1961), "Trigonia" nyangensis Aitken (1961), "Trigonia" stephaninii Venzo (1942), "Trigonia" undulatostriata Paulcke (1903) and "Trigonia" weaveri Stoyanow (1949).	
Tegulaedon	Gen. et comb. nov	Valid	Van Damme & Bogan in Van Damme, Bogan & Dierick	Jurassic		Egypt; Niger	An unionid bivalve belonging to the family Tegulaedontidae; a new genus for "Unio" humei Newton (1909).	
Tennessiella	Gen. et comb. nov	Valid	Cooper	Late Cretaceous (Campanian-Maastrichtian)		United States	A bivalve belonging to the family Pterotrigoniidae. The type species is "Trigonia" thoracica Morton (1834); genus also includes T. castrovillensis (Stephenson, 1941) and T. stantoni (Stephenson, 1941).	
Thyasira (Thyasira) beui	Sp. nov	Valid	Amano et al.	Early to middle Miocene	Bexhaven Limestone	New Zealand	A thyasirid bivalve, a species of Thyasira.	
Thyasira (Thyasira) marwicki	Nom. nov	Valid	Amano et al.	Late Miocene		New Zealand	A thyasirid bivalve, a species of Thyasira; a replacement name for Thyasira (Thyasira) planata Marwick (1926) (preoccupied).	
Trigonodesma tersa	Sp. nov	Valid	Berezovsky	Late Eocene	Mandrikovka Beds	Ukraine	A bivalve, a species of Trigonodesma.	
Tuaregunio	Gen. et comb. nov	Valid	Van Damme & Bogan in Van Damme, Bogan & Dierick	Middle or Late Jurassic	Irhazer Group	Niger	A bivalve belonging to the family Unionidae; a new genus for ?"Lampsilis" agadesensis Mongin (1963).	
Turanigonia	Gen. et comb. nov	Valid	Cooper	Late Cretaceous (Cenomanian)			A bivalve belonging to the family Rutitrigoniidae. The type species is "Trigonia" pseudoindica Arkhanguelsky (1916).	
Turikirella	Gen. et comb. nov	Valid	Cooper	Early Cretaceous (late Barremian - early Aptian)		Tanzania	A bivalve belonging to the family Rutitrigoniidae. The type species is "Megatrigonia (Rutitrigonia)" turikirae Aitken (1961); genus also includes T. bornhardti (Müller, 1900) and T. janenschi (Lange, 1914).	
Unionelloides (Unionelloides) bellalensis	Sp. nov	Valid	Van Damme & Bogan in Van Damme, Bogan & Dierick	Middle or Late Jurassic	Irhazer Group	Niger	A bivalve belonging to the family Unionidae, a species of Unionelloides.	
Venignia	Gen. et sp. et comb. nov	Valid	Berezovsky	Late Eocene		Germany; Ukraine	An ark clam. The type species is Venignia arcula; genus also contains Venignia radula (Koenen, 1893).	
Yanceyopsis alleni	Sp. nov	Valid	Waterhouse	Permian	Tiverton Formation	Australia	A bivalve belonging to the family Nuculidae.	
Yaninella	Gen. et comb. nov	Valid	Cooper	Early Cretaceous (Berriasian)		Crimean Peninsula	A bivalve belonging to the family Pterotrigoniidae. The type species is "Linotrigonia (Oistotrigonia)" belbekensis Yanin (1979).	
Yoldia bella	Sp. nov	Valid	Berezovsky	Late Eocene		Ukraine	A bivalve belonging to the group Nuculida, a species of Yoldia.	
Zigzagia	Gen. et comb. et sp. nov	Valid	Waterhouse	Permian		Australia	A bivalve belonging to the superfamily Nuculanoidea and the family Polidevciidae. The type species "Glyptoleda" buarabae Campbell (1951); genus also includes new species Z. stevensi.	
