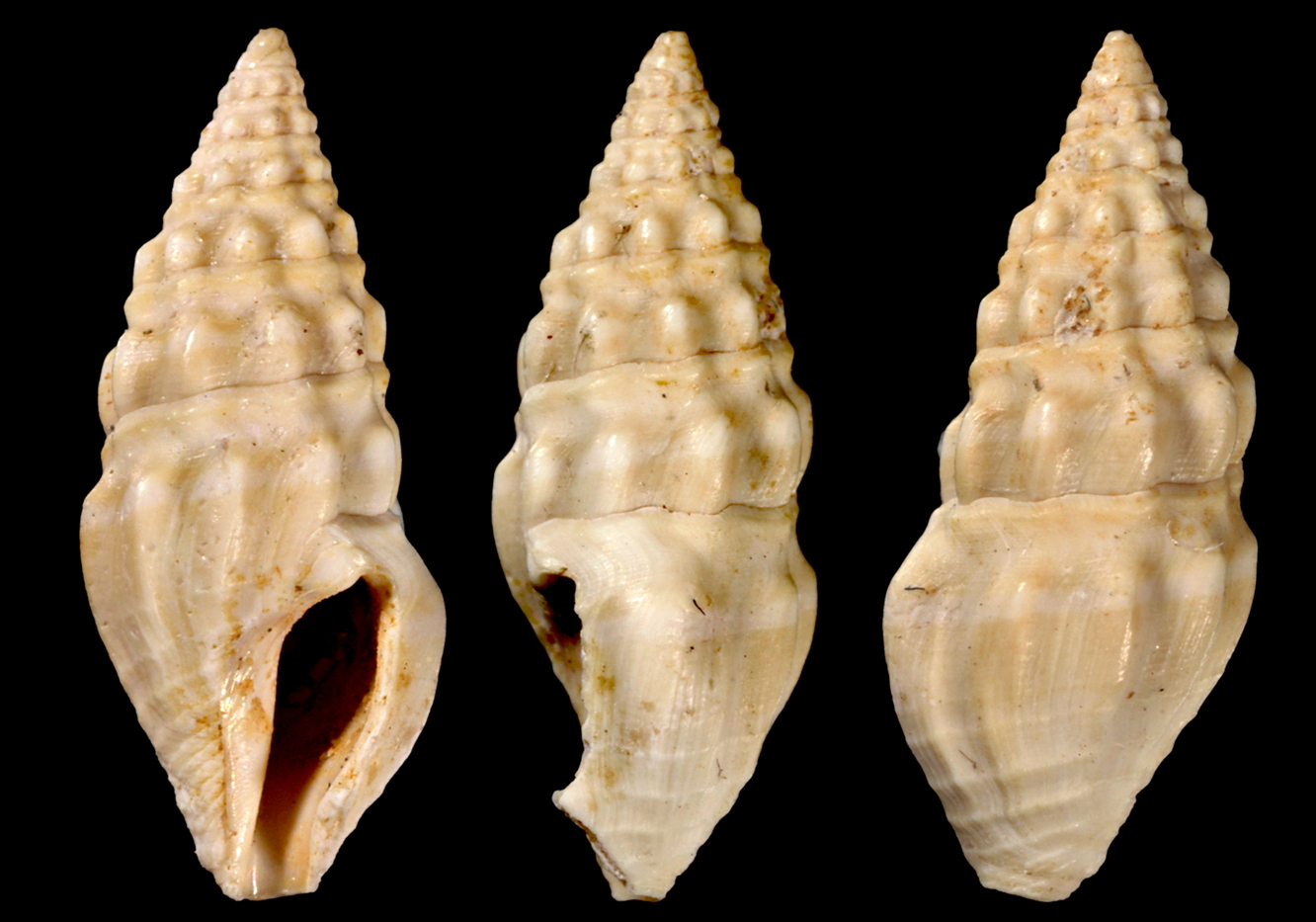
- Shells of Crassispira lesbarritzensis (holotype in MNHN, Paris)

Scientific classification
- Kingdom: Animalia
- Phylum: Mollusca
- Class: Gastropoda
- Subclass: Caenogastropoda
- Order: Neogastropoda
- Superfamily: Conoidea
- Family: Pseudomelatomidae
- Genus: Crassispira
- Species: C. lesbarritzensis

Binomial name
- Crassispira lesbarritzensis Lozouet, 2015

= Crassispira lesbarritzensis =

Extinct species of gastropod

Crassispira lesbarritzensis is an extinct species of sea snail, a marine gastropod mollusk in the family Pseudomelatomidae, the turrids and allies.

== Description ==
The length of the shell attains 11 mm.

== Distribution ==
Fossils have been found in Oligocene and lower Miocene strata in Nouvelle-Aquitaine, France.
