= Río Gurabo Formation =

- Stratigraphic range: Messinian-Zanclean
- Type: Formation

Lithology
- Primary: Limestone

Location
- Coordinates: 19.5°N 71.2°W
- Approximate paleocoordinates: 19.5°N 70.4°W
- Country: Dominican Republic
- Río Gurabo Formation (the Dominican Republic)

The Río Gurabo Formation is a geologic formation in the northwestern Dominican Republic. The reefal limestone preserves bivalve, gastropod and coral fossils dating back to the Messinian to Zanclean period.

== See also ==
- List of fossiliferous stratigraphic units in the Dominican Republic
