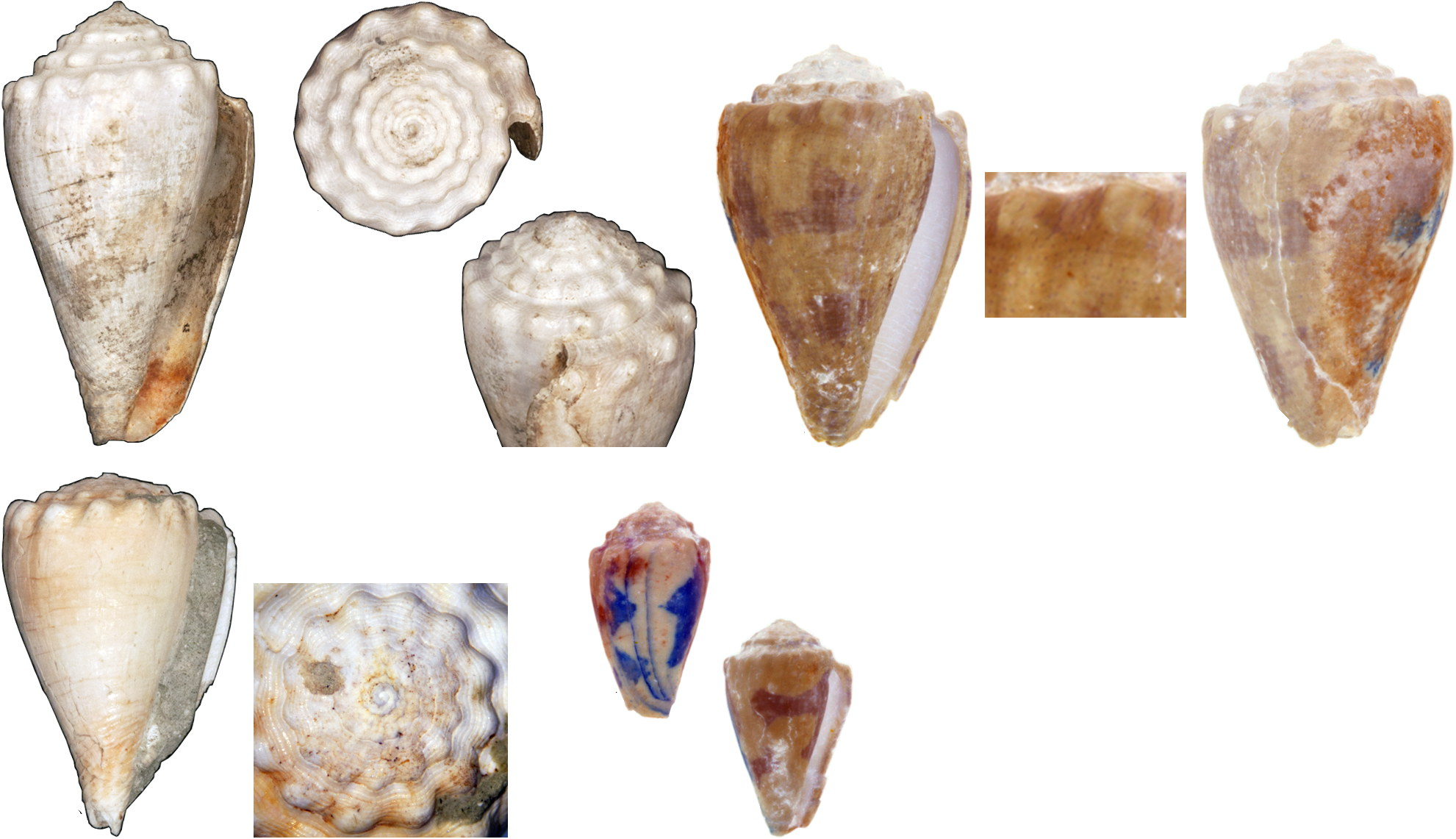
- The holotype and two paratypes of Conus gouldi

Scientific classification
- Kingdom: Animalia
- Phylum: Mollusca
- Class: Gastropoda
- Subclass: Caenogastropoda
- Order: Neogastropoda
- Superfamily: Conoidea
- Family: Conidae
- Genus: Conus
- Species: C. gouldi

Binomial name
- Conus gouldi Hendricks, 2015

Synonyms
- † Conus (Stephanoconus) gouldi Hendricks, 2015 · accepted, alternate representation

= Conus gouldi =

Conus gouldi Temporal range: Neogene

Species of sea snail

Conus gouldi is an extinct species of cone snail found in Miocene to Pliocene-aged marine strata of the Dominican Republic.

== Description ==
It's a moderately small shell, with the largest recorded specimens reaching approximately 25.6 mm in length. The shell is ventricosely conical with a slightly convex outline. Its widest part is located just below the shoulder.

== Distribution ==
This marine species is only known as a fossil from the Neogene of the Dominican Republic.
