= Frogdenites =

Frogdenites Temporal range: Bajocian

Scientific classification
- Kingdom: Animalia
- Phylum: Mollusca
- Class: Cephalopoda
- Subclass: †Ammonoidea
- Order: †Ammonitida
- Family: †Otoitidae
- Genus: †Frogdenites

Frogdenites is an extinct ammonite genus from the order Ammonitida that lived during the Middle Jurassic in what is now Europe, Canada, and Tibet. Frogdenites is included in the Otoitidae, a family which makes up part of the ammonitid superfamily, Stephanoceratoidea.

Frogdenites has an evolute globular shell with a deep umbilicus and covered by bifurcating ribs that cross the venter, the outer rim of the shell, without interruption.
