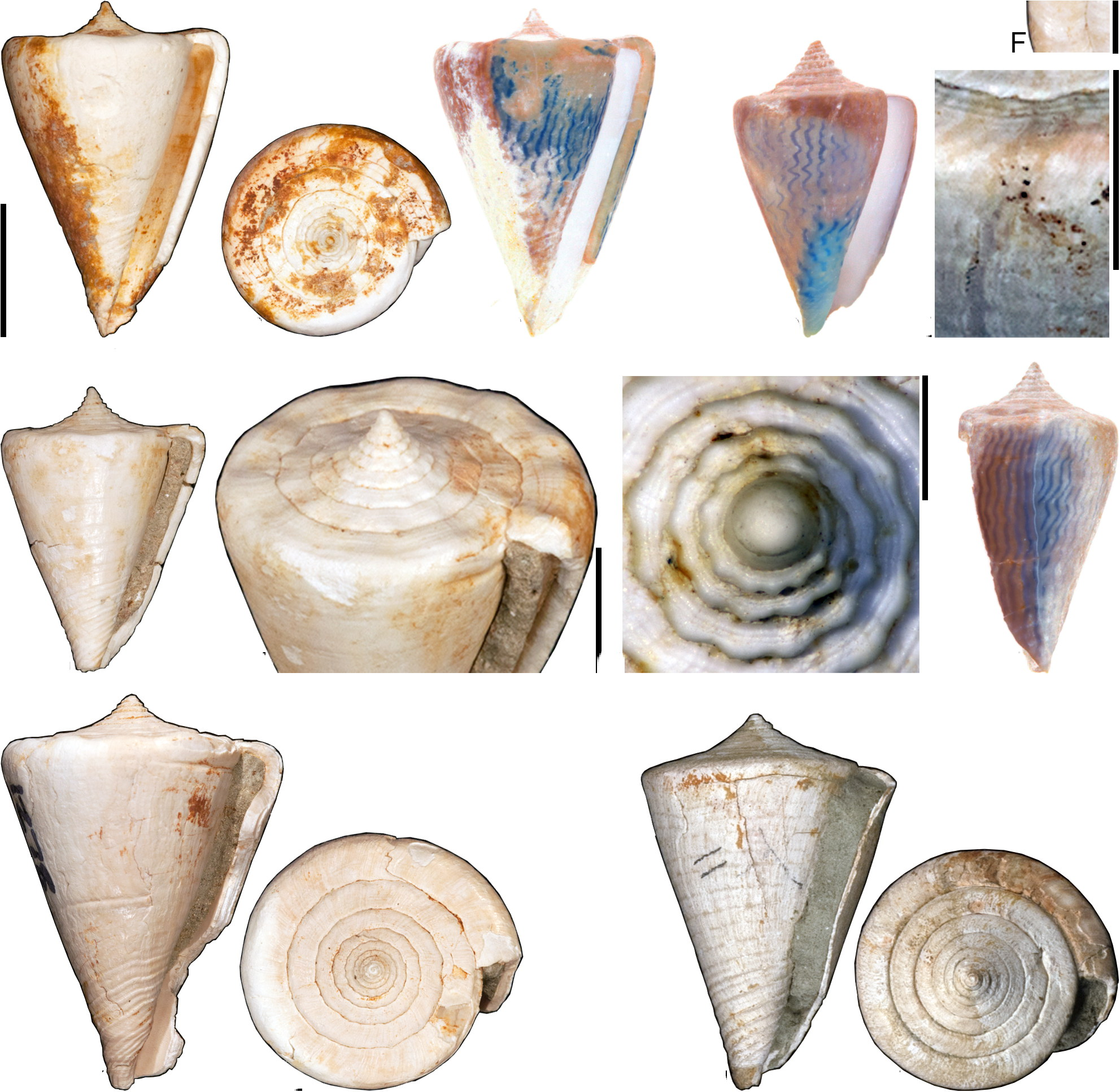
- Several shells of Conus lyelli; the colored specimens are reversed images of specimens photographed under UV light; the two specimens below right are specimens of Conus xenicus Pilsbry and Johnson, 1917

Conservation status
- Extinct

Scientific classification
- Kingdom: Animalia
- Phylum: Mollusca
- Class: Gastropoda
- Subclass: Caenogastropoda
- Order: Neogastropoda
- Superfamily: Conoidea
- Family: Conidae
- Genus: Conus
- Species: †C. lyelli

Binomial name
- †Conus lyelli Hendricks, 2015

= Conus lyelli =

Species of sea snail

Conus lyelli is an extinct species of sea snail, a marine gastropod mollusk in the family Conidae, the cone snails, cone shells or cones.

== Description ==
The size of the shell attains 29.4 mm. Conus lyelli shows tubercles on all postnuclear whorls. This species is different from any known extant species. This suggests that it, along with Conus xenicus, may be members of an extinct clade of cone snails.

== Distribution ==
This marine species is only known in the fossil state from the Neogene of the Dominican Republic.
