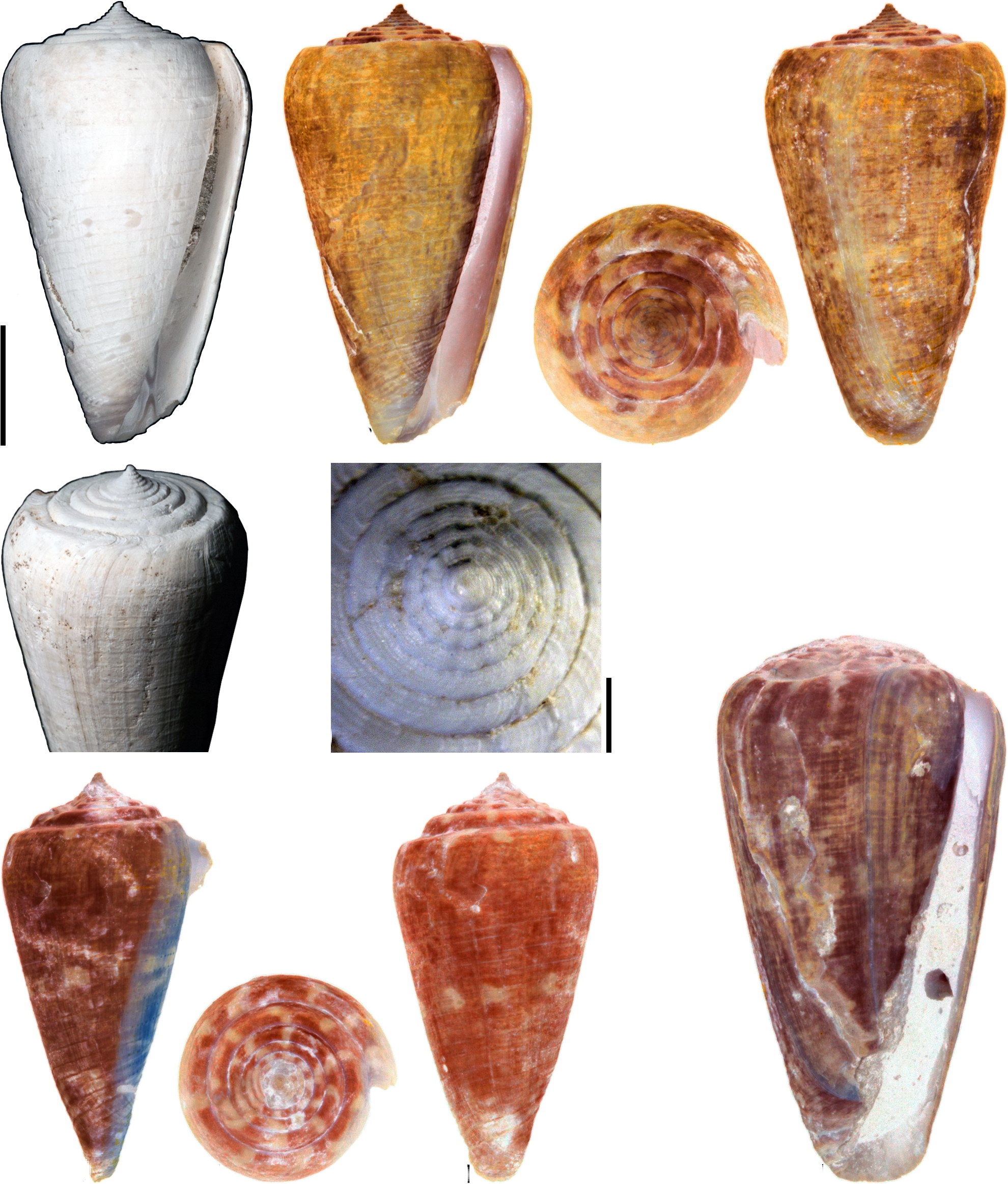
- Several views of shells of Conus zambaensis; some are reversed images of specimens photographed under UV light.

Conservation status
- Extinct

Scientific classification
- Kingdom: Animalia
- Phylum: Mollusca
- Class: Gastropoda
- Subclass: Caenogastropoda
- Order: Neogastropoda
- Superfamily: Conoidea
- Family: Conidae
- Genus: Conus
- Species: †C. zambaensis

Binomial name
- †Conus zambaensis Hendricks, 2015

Synonyms
- † Conus (Dauciconus) zambaensis Hendricks, 2015 · accepted, alternate representation

= Conus zambaensis =

Species of sea snail

Conus zambaensis is an extinct species of sea snail, a marine gastropod mollusk in the family Conidae, the cone snails, cone shells or cones.

== Description ==
The size of the shell attains 43 mm.

== Distribution ==
This marine species of cone snail is found as a fossil in the Neogene of the Dominican Republic.
