= Labyrinthoceras =

Labyrinthoceras Temporal range: Bajocian

Scientific classification
- Kingdom: Animalia
- Phylum: Mollusca
- Class: Cephalopoda
- Subclass: †Ammonoidea
- Order: †Ammonitida
- Family: †Sphaeroceratidae
- Genus: †Labyrinthoceras; Buckman, 1919

Labyrinthoceras is an extinct cephalopod genus included in the ammonoid family Sphaeroceratidae, a member of the superfamily Stephanoceratoidea, that lived during middle of the Jurassic Period.

Labtrinthoceras is described as large, round-whorled with an open umbilicus; body chamber smooth with a terminal constriction. The chambered phragmocone is finely ribbed. Coiling is eccentric, a character of the family.
