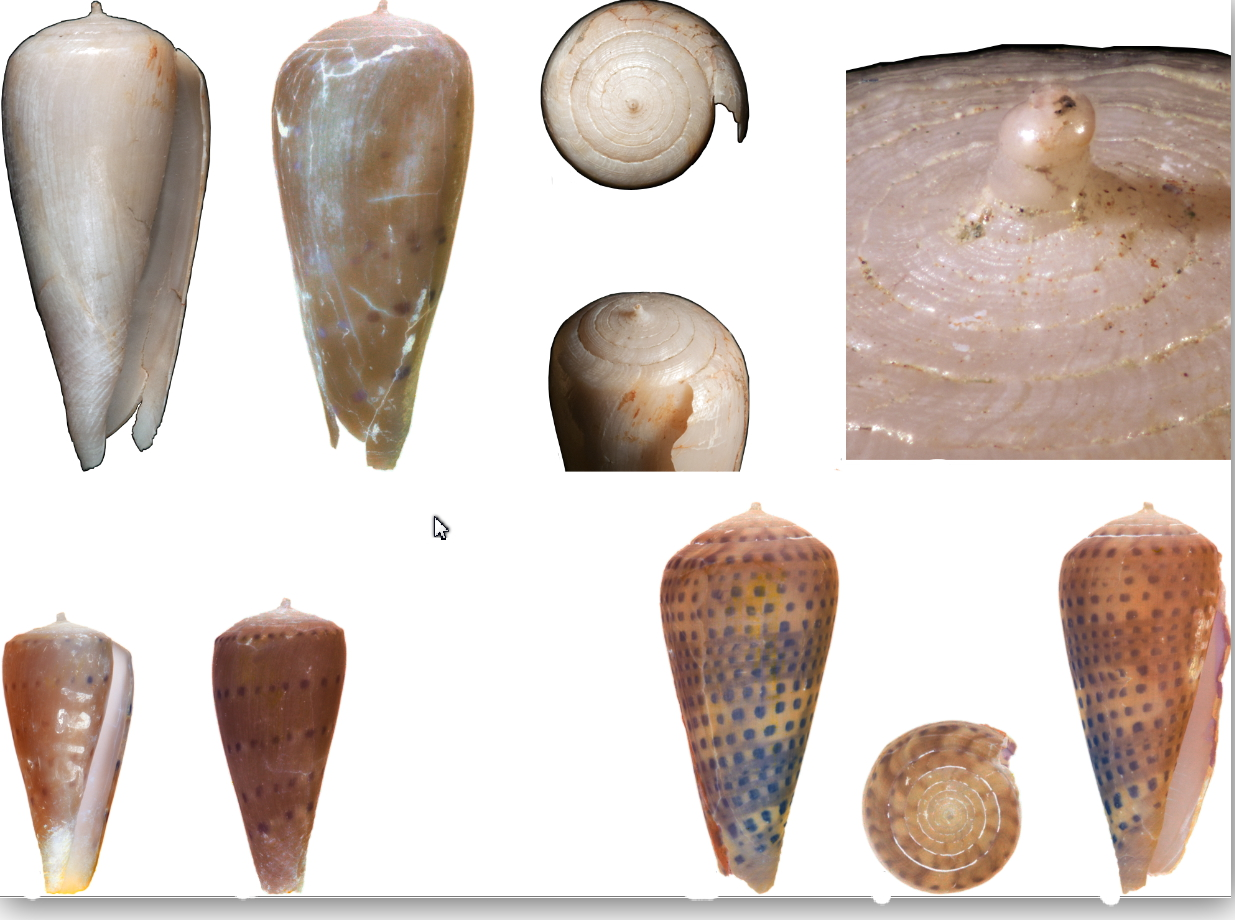
- Several shell specimens of Conus anningae

Conservation status
- Extinct

Scientific classification
- Kingdom: Animalia
- Phylum: Mollusca
- Class: Gastropoda
- Subclass: Caenogastropoda
- Order: Neogastropoda
- Superfamily: Conoidea
- Family: Conidae
- Genus: Conus
- Species: †C. anningae

Binomial name
- †Conus anningae Hendricks, 2015

= Conus anningae =

Species of sea snail

Conus anningae is an extinct species of sea snail, a marine gastropod mollusk in the family Conidae, the cone snails, cone shells or cones.

== Description ==
The size of the shell attains 30 mm.

== Distribution ==
This species is only known as a fossil from the lower Pliocene Gurabo Formation in the Dominican Republic.
