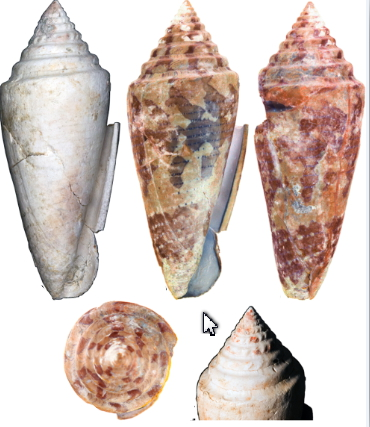
- Several views of a shell of Conus bellacoensis

Conservation status
- Extinct

Scientific classification
- Domain: Eukaryota
- Kingdom: Animalia
- Phylum: Mollusca
- Class: Gastropoda
- Subclass: Caenogastropoda
- Order: Neogastropoda
- Superfamily: Conoidea
- Family: Conidae
- Genus: Conus
- Species: †C. bellacoensis

Binomial name
- †Conus bellacoensis Hendricks, 2015

Synonyms
- † Conus (Stephanoconus) bellacoensis Hendricks, 2015 · accepted, alternate representation

= Conus bellacoensis =

Species of sea snail

Conus bellacoensis is an extinct species of sea snail, a marine gastropod mollusk in the family Conidae, the cone snails, cone shells or cones.

== Description ==
The size of the shell grows to a length of 76 mm.

== Distribution ==
This marine species is only known as a fossil from the Neogene of the Dominican Republic.
