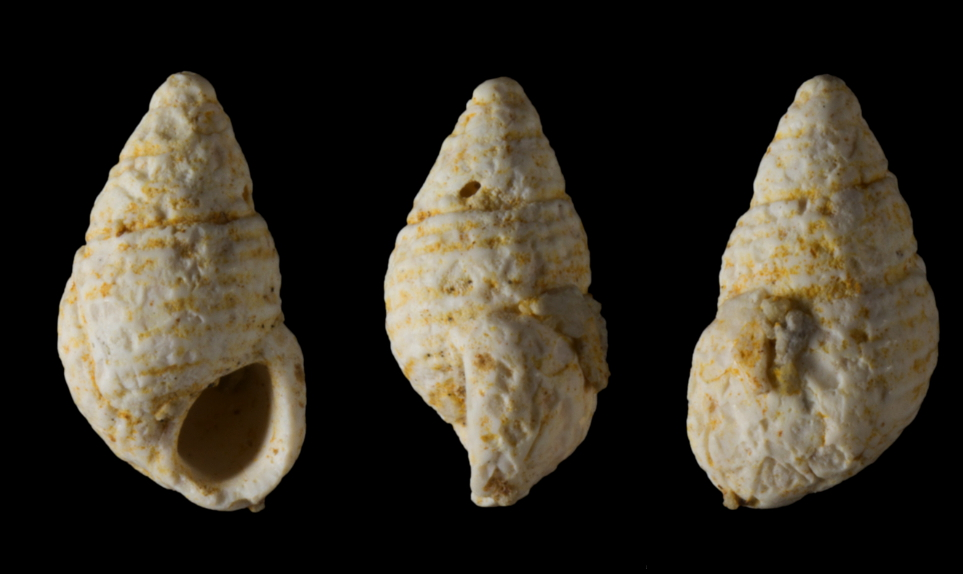
- Shell of Alvania doliolum (holotype at MNHN, Paris)

Scientific classification
- Kingdom: Animalia
- Phylum: Mollusca
- Class: Gastropoda
- Subclass: Caenogastropoda
- Order: Littorinimorpha
- Superfamily: Rissooidea
- Family: Rissoidae
- Genus: Alvania
- Species: †A. doliolum

Binomial name
- †Alvania doliolum Lozouet, 2015

= Alvania doliolum =

Species of gastropod

Alvania doliolum is an extinct species of minute sea snail, a marine gastropod mollusk or micromollusk in the family Rissoidae.

== Distribution ==
Fossils were found in Late Oligocene strata in the Landes, France.
