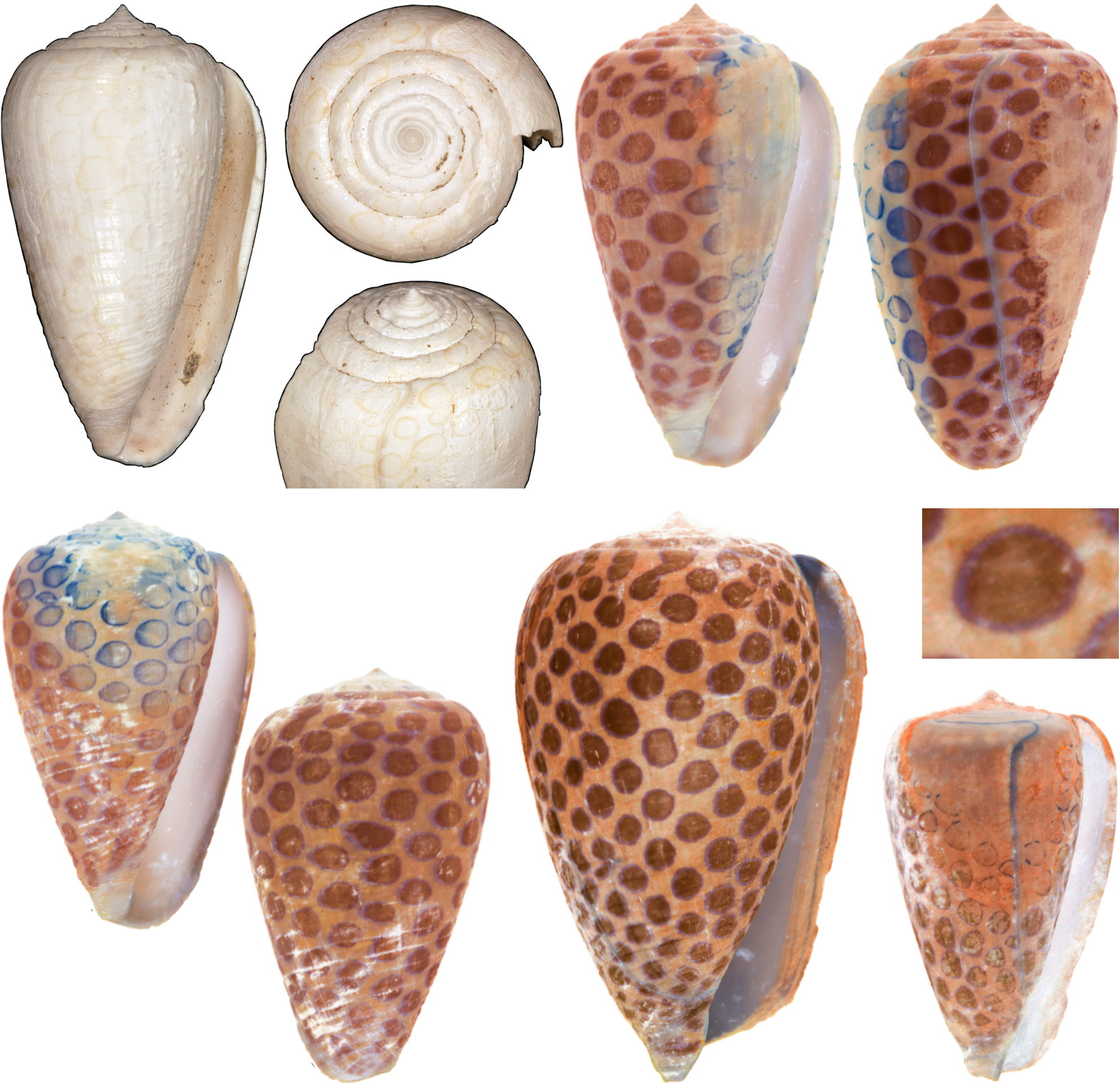
- Several images of Conus carlottae; the colored images are reversed images of specimens photographed under UV light.

Conservation status
- Extinct

Scientific classification
- Kingdom: Animalia
- Phylum: Mollusca
- Class: Gastropoda
- Subclass: Caenogastropoda
- Order: Neogastropoda
- Superfamily: Conoidea
- Family: Conidae
- Genus: Conus
- Species: †C. carlottae

Binomial name
- †Conus carlottae Hendricks, 2015

Synonyms
- † Conus (Lautoconus) carlottae Hendricks, 2015 · accepted, alternate representation

= Conus carlottae =

Species of sea snail

Conus carlottae is an extinct species of sea snail, a marine gastropod mollusk in the family Conidae, the cone snails, cone shells or cones.

== Description ==
The shell of Conus carlottae attains a size of 40 mm. Under ultraviolet light, fossil specimens reveal a unique pattern of large polka dots, a coloration pattern that appears to be extinct among modern cone snails.

== Distribution ==
This species is only known from fossils found in Neogene deposits of the Cibao Valley, northern Dominican Republic, specifically from the upper Miocene Cercado Formation and lower Pliocene Gurabo Formation, dating from approximately 6.6 to 4.8 million years ago.
