= Parasaurus =

Parasaurus Temporal range: Wuchiapingian, 258.9–255.7 Ma
- Model in Natural History Museum Kassel by Sebastian Brandt

Scientific classification
- Kingdom: Animalia
- Phylum: Chordata
- Class: Reptilia
- Clade: †Pareiasauria
- Family: †Pareiasauridae
- Genus: †Parasaurus von Meyer, 1857

Type species
- †Parasaurus geinitzi von Meyer, 1857

Extinct genus of reptiles

Parasaurus (meaning "near lizard") is a genus of pareiasaur known from fossils collected in the Kupferschiefer and Zechstein in Germany (Hesse, Thuringia and Lower Saxony), dating to the Late Permian (Wuchiapingian). The type species, Parasaurus geinitzi, described by Hermann von Meyer in 1857, was the first pareiasaur ever described. The first seven specimens were redescribed in 2008.

== Discovery and naming ==
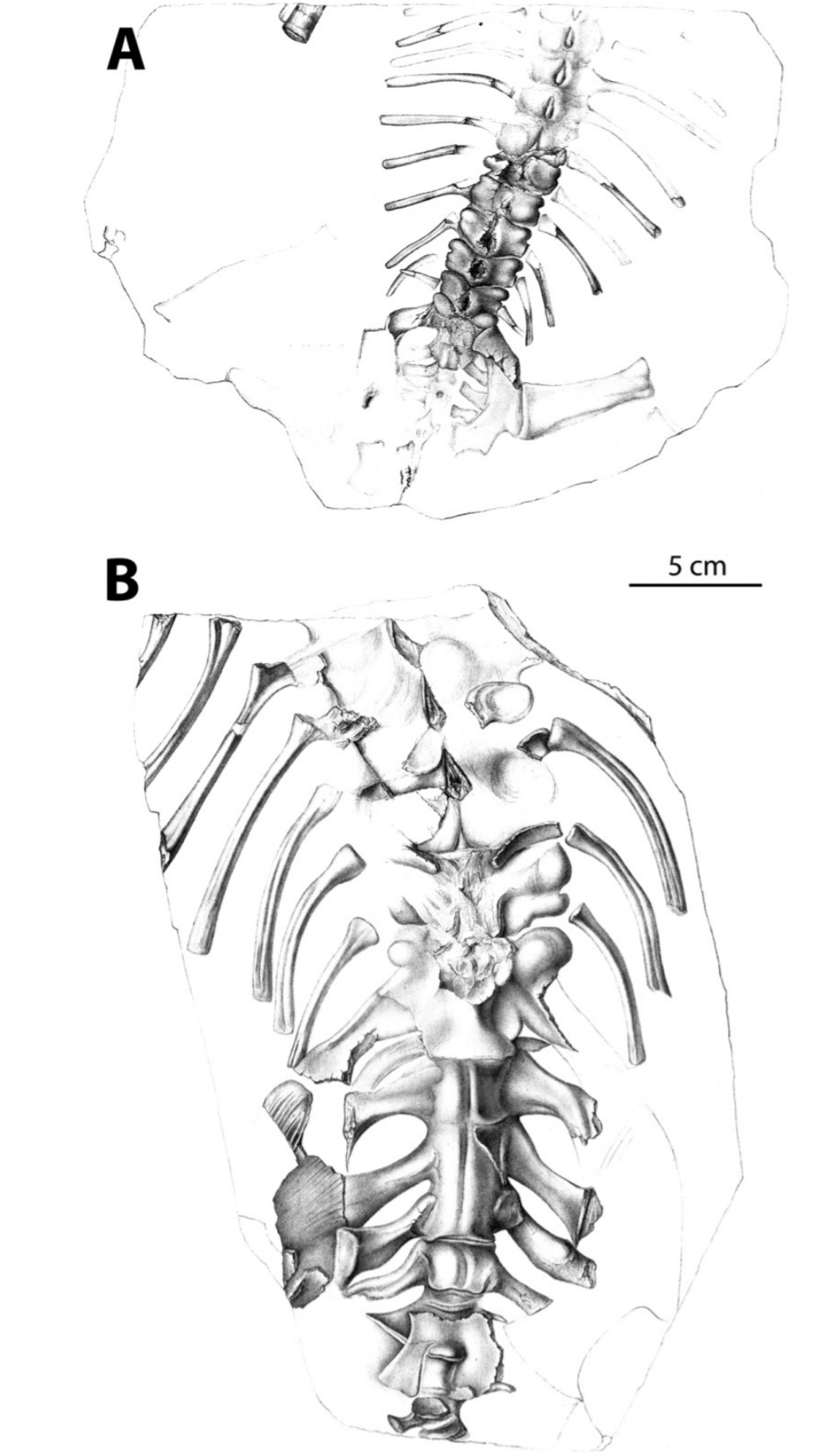
Dresden specimen (A) and Hannover specimen (B) of P. geinitzi

The first two specimens of Parasaurus geinitzi were collected from the Zechstein in Dresden and Hannover. The holotype, GZG.V.010.101, is the Hannover specimen and it was discovered by Oberbergrath Jugler in 1849. The Dresden specimen, ThP 279, was first studied by Hanns Bruno Geinitz in 1848, who later recovered it from the ashes of the Zwinger Palace when it was burnt during the Revolutions of 1849.

The remaining specimens were recovered from the Kupferschiefer in Buchholz in der Nordheide in 1986, Richelsdorf no later than 1977 and no later than 1985, and Bera-Iba no later than 1996. An eighth specimen, a rib fragment, was discovered no later than 2014 in the Zechstein near Korbach.

Hermann von Meyer initially classified the two known specimens within Protorosaurus speneri in 1856, and it was not until 1857 when von Meyer redescribed these fossils and created the Parasaurus genus. In 2008, Tsuji and Müller re-evaluated the genus. They assigned seven specimens to Parasaurus geinitzi, with an eighth being discovered shortly after.

== Description ==
Parasaurus was small for a pareiasaur, only around 50 centimetres (1.6 ft) long. Axial osteoderms appear to be absent. The skull surface is pitted, with small spike-like horns on the supratemporal and quadratojugal.

== Phylogeny ==
von Meyer classified Parasaurus as a reptile but it was classified as a pareiasaur when the family was created in 1888. Lee (1997a; 1997b) classified Parasaurus as a nomen dubium.

Below is a cladogram from Tsuji et al. (2013):

- Pareiasauria
  - "Bradysaurus" seeleyi
  - - Bradysaurus baini
    - Nochelesaurus
    - - Embrithosaurus
      - - Bunostegos
        - - - Deltavjatia
            - Parasaurus
          - Velosauria
            - - Nanopareia
              - Provelosaurus
              - - Anthodon
                - Pumiliopareia
            - - - Shansisaurus
                - - Shihtienfenia
                  - - Pareiasuchus peringueyi
                    - Pareiasuchus nasicornis
              - - Arganaceras
                - Elginia
                - Obirkovia
                - Pareiasaurus
                - Sanchuansaurus
                - Scutosaurus

== Paleoenvironment ==
The Kupferschiefer is a marine unit that forms part of the Zechstein, a sequence of rocks formed on the edge of the Zechstein Sea, a large inland shallow sea that existed in Northern Europe during the Late Permian. The environment at the time of deposition is considered to have been semi-arid. The terrestrial flora of the Zechstein is dominated by conifers, with seed ferns also being common, while taeniopterids, ginkgophytes and sphenophytes are rare. Other terrestrial vertebrates found in the Kupferschiefer and lower Zechstein include the gliding weigeltisaurid reptiles Weigeltisaurus and Glaurung, the archosauromorph reptile Protorosaurus, the cynodont Procynosuchus, and indeterminate captorhinids, dicynodonts, and dissorophid temnospondyls.
