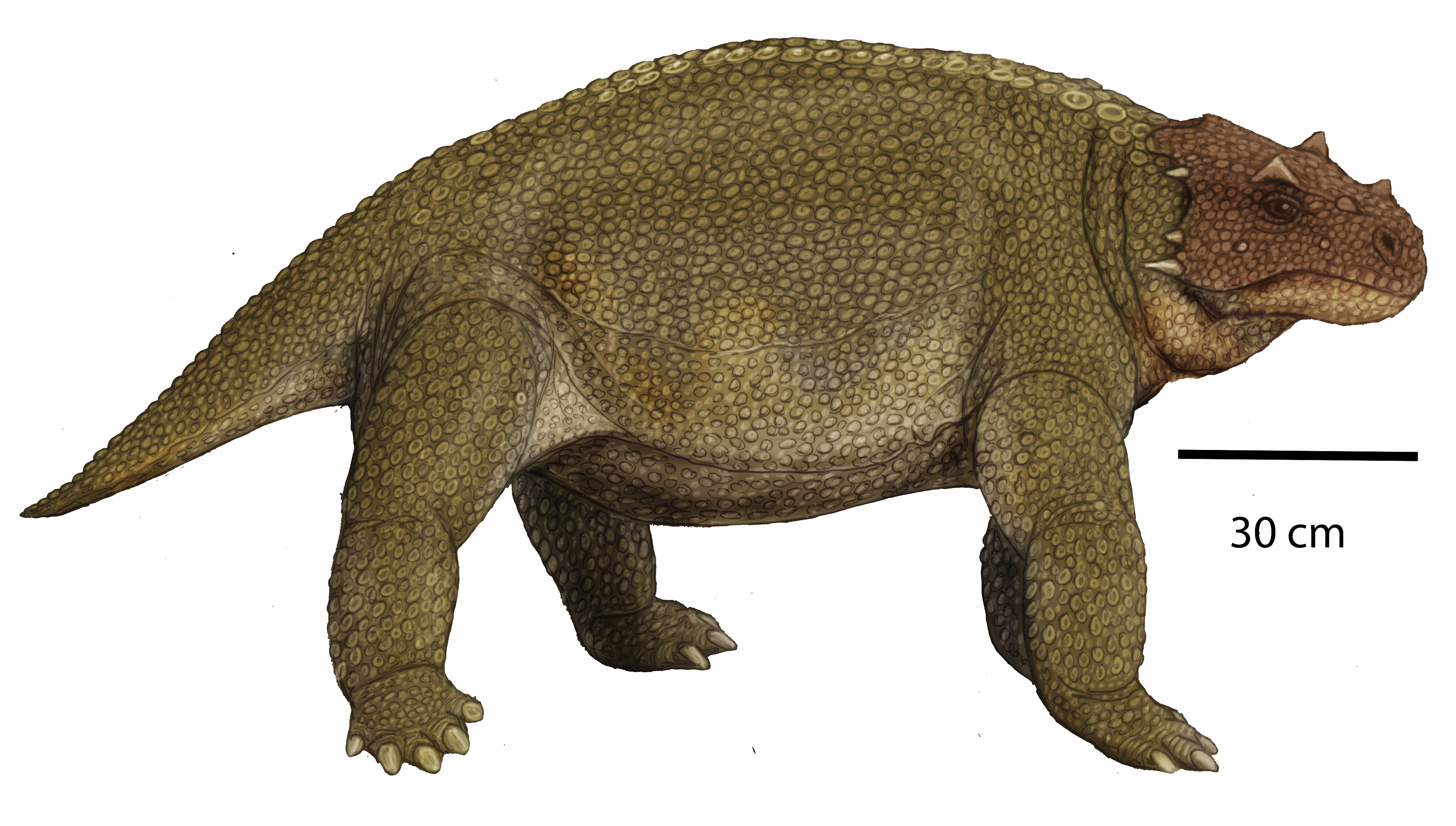
- Life restoration

Scientific classification
- Kingdom: Animalia
- Phylum: Chordata
- Class: Reptilia
- Clade: †Pareiasauria
- Family: †Pareiasauridae
- Genus: †Yinshanosaurus; Yi & Liu, 2025
- Species: †Y. angustus

Binomial name
- †Yinshanosaurus angustus Yi & Liu, 2025

= Yinshanosaurus =

Yinshanosaurus Temporal range: Late Permian, ?Wuchiapingian

Genus of extinct stem-reptile

External image
- Holotype skull: photograph (top) and line drawing (bottom).

Yinshanosaurus is an extinct genus of pareiasaurian 'parareptile' known from the Late Permian Naobaogou and Sunjiagou formations of China. The genus contains a single species, Yinshanosaurus angustus, known from a partial skeleton including a skull and an additional isolated skull.

== Discovery and naming ==
The Yinshanosaurus angustus holotype specimen, IVPP V 33181, was collected in 2018 from outcrops of the Naobaogou Formation near Qiandian Village in Inner Mongolia, China. It consists of a partial articulated skeleton, including a skull, both scapulocoracoids, the third–fifth cervical (neck) vertebrae, thirteen dorsal (back) vertebrae and three isolated dorsal neural spines, several ribs, and the acetabular part of the left ilium. Several osteoderms are preserved in association with the vertebral column. The skull is eroded and crushed but otherwise nearly complete. An additional nearly complete skull, SXNHM V0010.12, was collected in 2015 from the Sunjiagou Formation of Shanxi, China. This formation is likely similar in age to the Naobaogou Formation. Based on similarities to the holotype, SXNHM V0010.12 was referred as the paratype of Y. angustus.

Prior to its formal naming, the fossil material was first announced in 2024 in an unreviewed preprint hosted by bioRxiv. However, the taxon was considered informally named as the manuscript did not yet meet the necessary requirements of the International Code of Zoological Nomenclature (ICZN). In 2025, Jian Yi and Jun Liu formally described Yinshanosaurus angustus as a new genus and species of pareiasaurs based on these fossil remains. The generic name, Yinshanosaurus, combines "Yinshan", the ancient name of the mountain the type locality is in, with the Ancient Greek σαῦρος (sauros), meaning "lizard". The specific name, angustus, is a Latin word meaning "narrow", referencing the slender morphology of the skull compared to other pareiasaurs.

== Classification ==
In their 2025 phylogenetic analyses, Yi and Liu recovered Yinshanosaurus as a deeply-nested member of the Pareiasauria as the sister taxon to a species named in 2019 as a member of the genus Shihtienfenia, S. completus. This species, found in the Sunjiagou Formation of China from which the Yinshanosaurus paratype is also known, is known from a complete skull and mandible. However, their results placed S. permica, the type species of Shihtienfenia, in a disparate part of the tree, suggesting S. completus should not be included in that genus. The clade containing Yinshanosaurus and "Shihtienfenia" completus was found to be the sister group to the clade Pumiliopareiasauria, with this clade in turn the sister to the Therischia. The results are displayed in the cladogram below, with Chinese pareiasaurs highlighted and both Shihtienfenia species in a darker shade.

- Pareiasauria
  - Bradysauria
    - Embrithosaurus
    - - Bradysaurus
      - Nochelesaurus
  - - Bunostegos
    - - Honania
      - - Deltavjatia
        - - - - "Shihtienfenia" completus
              - Yinshanosaurus
            - Pumiliopareiasauria
              - Provelosaurus
              - - Nanoparia
                - - Anthodon
                  - Pumiliopareia
          - Therischia
            - - Pareiasuchus spp.
              - - Huanghesaurus
                - Shansisaurus
                - Shihtienfenia permica
            - - Pareiasaurus
              - Scutosaurus
              - Elginiidae
                - Arganaceras
                - Elginia mirabilis
                - Elginia wuyongae
                - Obirkovia
