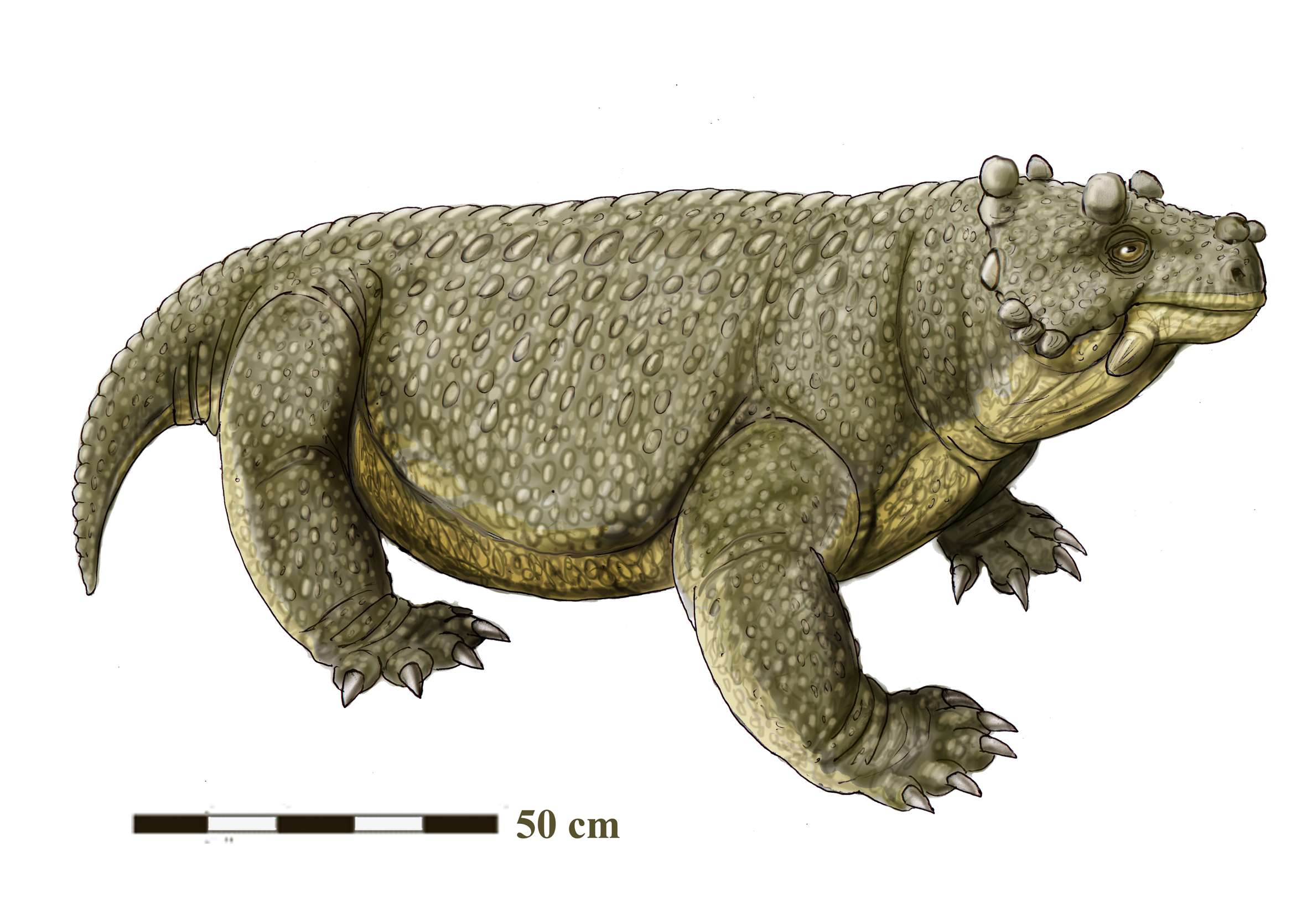
- Life restoration

Scientific classification
- Kingdom: Animalia
- Phylum: Chordata
- Class: Reptilia
- Clade: †Pareiasauria
- Genus: †Bunostegos; Sidor et al., 2003

Type species
- †Bunostegos akokanensis Sidor et al., 2003

= Bunostegos =

Bunostegos Temporal range: Lopingian, 252 Ma

Genus of extinct stem-reptile

Bunostegos ("knobbly [skull] roof") is an extinct genus of pareiasaur 'parareptile' from the Late Permian of the Agadez Region in Niger. The type species, Bunostegos akokanensis, was named from the Moradi Formation in 2003. It was a cow-sized animal with a distinctive skull that had large bony knobs, similar in form to those of other pareiasaurs but far larger. The species appears to have lived in a desert in the centre of the supercontinent of Pangaea.

Analysis of the limb bones (including the scapulocoracoid, humerus, radius, ulna, pelvis, and femur) was published in 2015, and revealed that Bunostegos walked upright on four limbs, with the body held above ground. This new information directly suggests that it could be the first tetrapod with a fully erect gait.

== Description ==
The animal has been described as about the size of a modern cow with a knobbly skull and bony plate armor on its back." Its teeth show it to have been a plant eater. It lived in an isolated desert region of the supercontinent of Pangaea some 260 million years ago. Its home region appears to have supported a distinctive fauna, in contrast to the rest of the supercontinent, where species were broadly distributed. It is particularly notable for the large bony knobs on its head, bigger than any seen in other species of pareiasaur. In life they were probably skin-covered horns or ossicones similar to those of modern giraffes. They are thought not to have served a protective function but were probably purely ornamental, perhaps aiding recognition between or within particular species.

Bunostegos may have been part of a relict population that clung on in central Pangaea, isolated from other more advanced species by the hyperarid conditions in which it lived. It is more closely related to older and more primitive pareiasaurs. The centre of the supercontinent appears to have been a very dry desert, which prevented population exchanges between the interior and exterior and kept Bunostegos in reproductive isolation. Only a few million years later, however, Bunostegos and most of the other pareiasaurs died out in the Permian–Triassic extinction event of 252 million years ago.

The evidence Bunostegos walked upright:

- the shoulder part (scapulocoracoid) where the upper arm bone moved is oriented more downward and to the back than off to side as in other pareiasaurs, allowing a greater vertical movement.
- the humerus (upper arm bone) does not fit into a spread out posture
- the elbow joint allows a front to back movement as in an animal standing upright.

Near vertical hind limbs were usual for pareiasaurs, but Bunostegos was more advanced in having all four limbs vertical.

== Discovery ==
Bunostegos akokanensis was named by paleontologists Christian A. Sidor, David C. Blackburn and Boubé Gado in 2003. Remains of Bunostegos were uncovered from the Moradi Formation near the town of Akokan in 2003 and 2006. The genus name means "knobby roof" in Greek as a reference to the bony knobs on its skull and the species name akokanensis references Akokan. Bunostegos is currently known from several skulls and postcranial remains. The holotype specimen MNN-MOR72, which served as the basis for the initial description of Bunostegos, is a weathered skull lacking the lower jaw. MNN-MOR86, a better-preserved skull also lacking the lower jaw, MNN-MOR28, a less deformed but heavily weathered skull, and MNN-MOR47, a partial skull preserving the palate and braincase, served as the basis for a 2013 description of the skull anatomy of Bunostegos.

== Relationships ==
Bunostegos belongs to a group of reptiles called pareiasaurs, a group of large herbivores that lived across much of Pangaea during the Permian period. The most derived pareiasaurs such as Elginia and Arganaceras have highly ornamented skulls with many bony projections. The skull of Bunostegos is also heavily ornamented, yet Bunostegos is not thought to be very closely related to derived pareiasaurs. In its initial description, Sidor, Blackburn, and Gado considered Bunostegos to possess a combination of basal ("primitive") and derived ("advanced") pareiasaur features. An analysis of the evolutionary relationships of pareiasaurs published in 2013 found Bunostegos to be one of the most basal taxa within Pareiasauria, with primitive features such as a high number of marginal teeth contributing to its position in the evolutionary tree. Given that more derived pareiasaurs than Bunostegos lack heavily ornamented skulls, ornamentation likely evolved independently in Bunostegos and in advanced pareiasaurs. Below is the cladogram from the 2013 study:

- Parareptilia
  - Millerettidae
  - Procolophonia
    - Owenetta
    - Pareiasauromorpha
      - Bashkyroleter bashkyricus
      - Bashkyroleter mesensis
      - Emeroleter
      - Nycteroleter
      - Rhipaeosaurus
      - - Macroleter
        - Pareiasauria
          - "Bradysaurus" seeleyi
          - - Bradysaurus baini
            - Nochelesaurus
            - - Embrithosaurus
              - - Bunostegos
                - - - Parasaurus
                    - Deltavjatia
                  - Velosauria
                    - - Nanoparia
                      - Provelosaurus
                      - - Pumiliopareia
                        - Anthodon
                    - - - Shansisaurus
                        - - Shihtienfenia
                          - - Pareiasuchus nasicornis
                            - Pareiasuchus peringueyi
                      - - Arganaceras
                        - Elginia
                        - Obirkovia
                        - Pareiasaurus
                        - Sanchuansaurus
                        - Scutosaurus

== Paleoecology ==
Bunostegos was part of a distinct paleofauna that existed in what is now Niger during the Late Permian. Other Gondwanan paleofaunas are known from the Karoo Basin of South Africa, Luangwa Basin of Zambia, and Ruhuhu Basin of Tanzania. These faunas are all quite similar to each other, implying that there were few biogeographic barriers to prevent faunal interchanges between these basins. In addition to Bunostegos, the Moradi Formation has yielded fossils of two very basal temnospondyl amphibians (Saharastega and Nigerpeton) that share more in common with temnospondyls from the Carboniferous and Early Permian than with contemporary forms, and the unusually large captorhinid reptile Moradisaurus. The only other fossil assemblage that shows similarities with the Moradi assemblage is that of the Ikakern Formation in Morocco, which includes a late-surviving species of the lepospondyl amphibian Diplocaulus, an unnamed large captorhinid, and the pareiasaur Arganaceras.

Studies of the sediments of the Moradi Formation show that the region was extremely arid during the Late Permian but had a shallow groundwater table that could support plant and animal life. Climate models of the Late Permian suggest that this arid region extended across much of central Pangaea. The Moradi Formation may have been a refugium for many tetrapods that were once diverse earlier in the Permian but had been replaced elsewhere on the supercontinent by new tetrapod faunas. The presence of Bunostegos in the Moradi Formation supports this hypothesis because, as a basal pareiasaur, it is most similar to pareiasaurs that lived during the Middle Permian —several tens of millions of years before it actually occurs in the fossil record. Ancestors of Bunostegos may have been part of a long ghost lineage living in isolation in central Pangaea long after other basal pareiasaurs became extinct.
