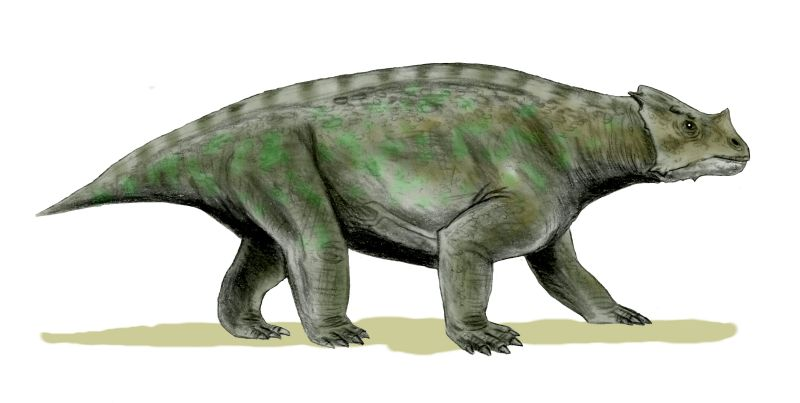
- Restoration of Arganaceras

Scientific classification
- Kingdom: Animalia
- Phylum: Chordata
- Class: Reptilia
- Clade: †Pareiasauria
- Family: †Pareiasauridae
- Genus: †Arganaceras; Jalil and Janvier, 2005

Type species
- †Arganaceras vacanti Jalil and Janvier, 2005

= Arganaceras =

Arganaceras Temporal range: Wuchiapingian, 260–254 Ma

Genus of Pareiasaur

Arganaceras ("Argana horn") is a medium-sized pareiasaur from the Late Permian Ikakern Formation of Morocco. It was about 2 metres (6.6 ft) in length and had a horn-like structure on its snout.

== Description ==
The holotype and only described specimen of Arganaceras (ARG 518) is a reasonably complete, disarticulated skull. Several features of the skull were interpreted as indicative of the holotype being immature when it died, such as a lack of fusion between the quadrate and elements of the cranial vault, as well as some unossified elements. The authors postulate that the cranial ornamentation seen in the holotype would likely be more prominent in an adult individual. Arganaceras is described as a large pareiasaur, distinguished from its relatives by eleven autapomorphic features. It possessed horn-like protuberances on the squamosal and quadratojugal, which are compared to similar ornamentation in Elginia. A noteworthy feature of Arganaceras' skull is the conical bony protuberance present on the nasal midline; other pareiasaurs, including the aforementioned Elginia as well as Pareiasuchus, Scutosaurus, and Bunostegos also possess nasal protuberances. The nasal protuberance of Arganaceras is most similar to that of Elginia and Pareiasuchus, being located in a medial position along the nasal midline, whereas it is located laterally in Scutosaurus and Bunostegos. The premaxillary teeth of Arganaceras are procumbent, and the dentition is described as pleurothecodont, which the authors note is a widespread tooth morphology among herbivorous land animals.

== Palaeoecology ==
The Ikakern Formation is part of the Argana Group, which also features fossiliferous formations that are dated to the Triassic period. Very few tetrapod remains have been found in the Ikakern Formation. Aside from Arganaceras, only a diplocaulid similar to Diploceraspis and the captorhinid Acrodenta have been described. Despite this, ichnofossils are moderately diverse, ranging from tetrapod footprints, to arthropod burrows, to arthropod feeding traces.

== Phylogeny ==
In 2025, Jian Yi and Jun Liu described a new pareiasaur, Yinshanosaurus. The paper featured a phylogenetic analysis focused on the inter-relationships within pareiasauria; the results are displayed in the cladogram below. They found Arganaceras to be most closely related to Elginia and Obirkovia. Together, the three genera are found to represent a novel clade within pareiasauria, dubbed elginiidae.

- Pareiasauria
  - Bradysauria
    - Embrithosaurus
    - - Bradysaurus
      - Nochelesaurus
  - - Bunostegos
    - - Honania
      - - Deltavjatia
        - - - - "Shihtienfenia" completus
              - Yinshanosaurus
            - Pumiliopareiasauria
              - Provelosaurus
              - - Nanoparia
                - - Anthodon
                  - Pumiliopareia
          - Therischia
            - - Pareiasuchus spp.
              - - Huanghesaurus
                - Shansisaurus
                - Shihtienfenia permica
            - - Pareiasaurus
              - Scutosaurus
              - Elginiidae
                - Arganaceras
                - Elginia mirabilis
                - Elginia wuyongae
                - Obirkovia
