= Obirkovia =

Obirkovia Temporal range: Late Permian (Tatarian Substage)

Scientific classification
- Kingdom: Animalia
- Phylum: Chordata
- Class: Reptilia
- Clade: †Pareiasauria
- Clade: †Elginiidae
- Genus: †Obirkovia
- Species: †O. gladiator

Binomial name
- †Obirkovia gladiator Bulanov & Yashina, 2005

Genus of extinct pareiasaur reptiles

Obirkovia is an extinct genus of pareiasaur from the late Permian Salarevo Formation of Russia. The genus contains a single species, O. gladiator, known from a left quadratojugal.

== Discovery and naming ==
The Obirkovia holotype specimen, PIN, no. 4546/18, was discovered in sediments of the Salarevo Formation (Vyatka Horizon) at the Obirkovo locality in Babushkinskii District of Vologda Oblast, Russia. The specimen consists of a single left quadratojugal.

In 2005, Bulanov & Yashina described Obirkovia gladiator as a new genus and species of elginiid pareiasaur based on these fossil remains. The generic name, "''Obirkovia", references the locality where the holotype was discovered. The specific name, "gladiator", references the armed combatants of Ancient Rome.

== Classification ==
Cisneros, Dentzien-Dias & Francischini (2021) recovered Obirkovia as an elginiid member of the Pareiasauria, in a clade that also contains Elginia spp. and Arganaceras. The results of their phylogenetic analyses are shown in the cladogram below:

- Pareiasauria
  - 'Bradysaurus' seeleyi
  - - Nochelesaurus
    - - Bradysaurus baini
      - - Embrithosaurus
        - - Bunostegos
          - - Parasaurus
            - Honania
            - Deltavjatia
            - Pumiliopareiasauria
              - Provelosaurus
              - Nanoparia
              - - Pumiliopareia
                - Anthodon
            - Therischia
              - - Shihtienfenia
                - - Pareiasuchus nasicornis
                  - Pareiasuchus peringueyi
              - - Scutosaurus
                - - Pareiasaurus serridens
                  - Elginiidae
                    - Elginia wuyongae
                    - Elginia mirabilis
                    - Obirkovia
                    - Arganaceras
