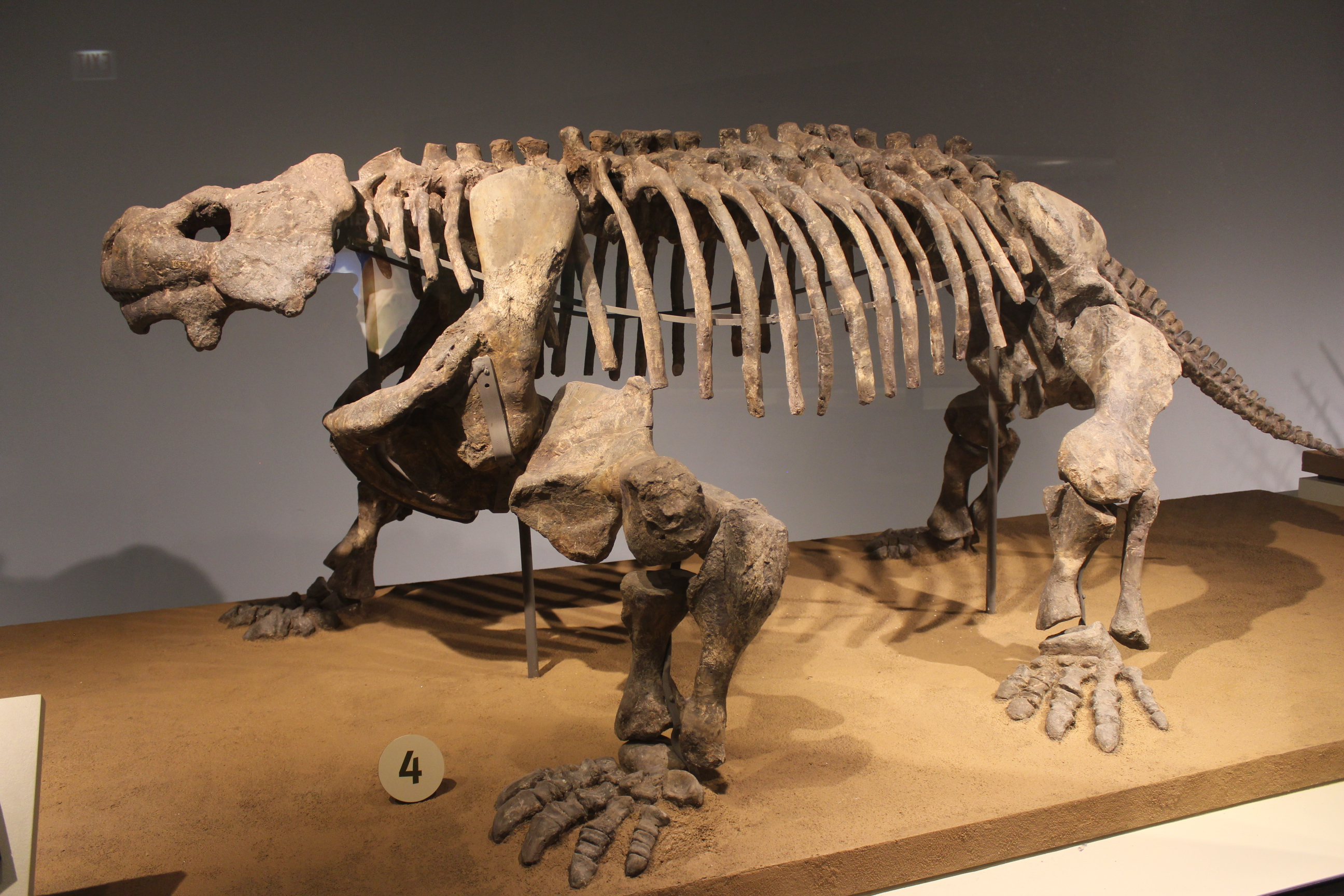
- Skeleton in the Field Museum

Scientific classification
- Kingdom: Animalia
- Phylum: Chordata
- Class: Reptilia
- Clade: †Pareiasauria
- Family: †Pareiasauridae
- Subfamily: †Bradysaurinae von Huene, 1948
- Genus: †Bradysaurus; Watson, 1914

Type species
- †Bradysaurus baini Seeley, 1892

Species
- †B. baini Seeley, 1892; †B. seeleyi Haughton and Boonstra, 1929

Synonyms
- Bradysaurus broomi Haughton and Boonstra, 1929; Bradysaurus vanderbyli Haughton and Boonstra, 1929; Pareiasaurus baini Pareiasaurus baini Seeley, 1892; Platyoropha broom Haughton and Boonstra, 1929

= Bradysaurus =

Bradysaurus Temporal range: Capitanian, 265–260 Ma

Extinct genus of reptiles

Bradysaurus is a genus of large, basal pareiasaur. They possessed a covering of armoured scutes, likely serving as defense against predators. Fossils of Bradysaurus are known from the Tapinocephalus Assemblage Zone (Capitanian age) of the South African Karoo. Along with the similarly large dinocephalia, the bradysaurs constituted the herbivorous megafauna of the late Middle Permian Period in the region.

== Classification and species ==
Bradysaurus is the only member of the subfamily Bradysaurinae. It is the most primitive known pareiasaur and can be considered a good ancestral type from which the others developed. Its large dimensions show that, even very early in their evolutionary history, these strange animals had already attained an optimal size. Even later, more advanced forms, like Scutosaurus, were no larger. The advantage of large size was to provide defense against predators and to maintain a stable body temperature (gigantothermy).

Kuhn 1969 lists no fewer than nine species for this genus, but this is certainly an excessive number. Boonstra 1969 distinguishes only four species on the basis of tooth structure, two of which Kuhn places in the genus Embrithosaurus. The genera Brachypareia, Bradysuchus, Koalemasaurus, and Platyoropha are synonyms of Bradysaurus.

=== Bradysaurus baini ===
B. baini (Seeley, 1892) is from the Tapinocephalus zone, Lower Beaufort Beds, Karoo basin, South Africa. This is the type species for the genus. The quadra-jugal region (cheek-bones) were only moderately developed. The snout was broad and rounded and there were 15 or 16 pairs of overlapping teeth in each jaw. This animal could be considered a generic early pareiasaur. According to Lee, 1997, the available material of B. baini lacks distinguishing autapomorphies or characteristics.

=== Bradysaurus seeleyi ===
B. seeleyi (Haughton and Boonstra, 1929) is from the Tapinocephalus zone, Lower Beaufort Beds, Karoo basin, South Africa. This is a less common form. Boonstra, 1969, considered this a valid species of Bradysaurus and Lee, 1997, considers this animal a sister group to more advanced pareiasaurs. B. seelyi seems to be closely related to Nochelesaurus and Embrithosaurus. In contrast to the more numerous but similarly sized B. baini, the cheekbones were heavy and greatly enlarged. There were 19 or 20 pairs of strongly overlapping teeth on each jaw.

=== Phylogeny ===
Bradysaurus is the titular member of Bradysauria, a group of large, early diverging pareiasaurs known from the Middle Permian of South Africa alongside Embrithosaurus and Nochelesaurus. Cladogram after Li & Yun, 2025:

- Pareiasauria
  - Bradysauria
    - Embrithosaurus
    - - Bradysaurus
      - Nochelesaurus
  - - Bunostegos
    - - Honania
      - - Deltavjatia
        - - - - "Shihtienfenia" completus
              - Yinshanosaurus
            - Pumiliopareiasauria
              - Provelosaurus
              - - Nanoparia
                - - Anthodon
                  - Pumiliopareia
          - Therischia
            - - Pareiasuchus spp.
              - - Huanghesaurus
                - Shansisaurus
                - Shihtienfenia permica
            - - Pareiasaurus
              - Scutosaurus
              - Elginiidae
                - Arganaceras
                - Elginia mirabilis
                - Elginia wuyongae
                - Obirkovia

== Description ==
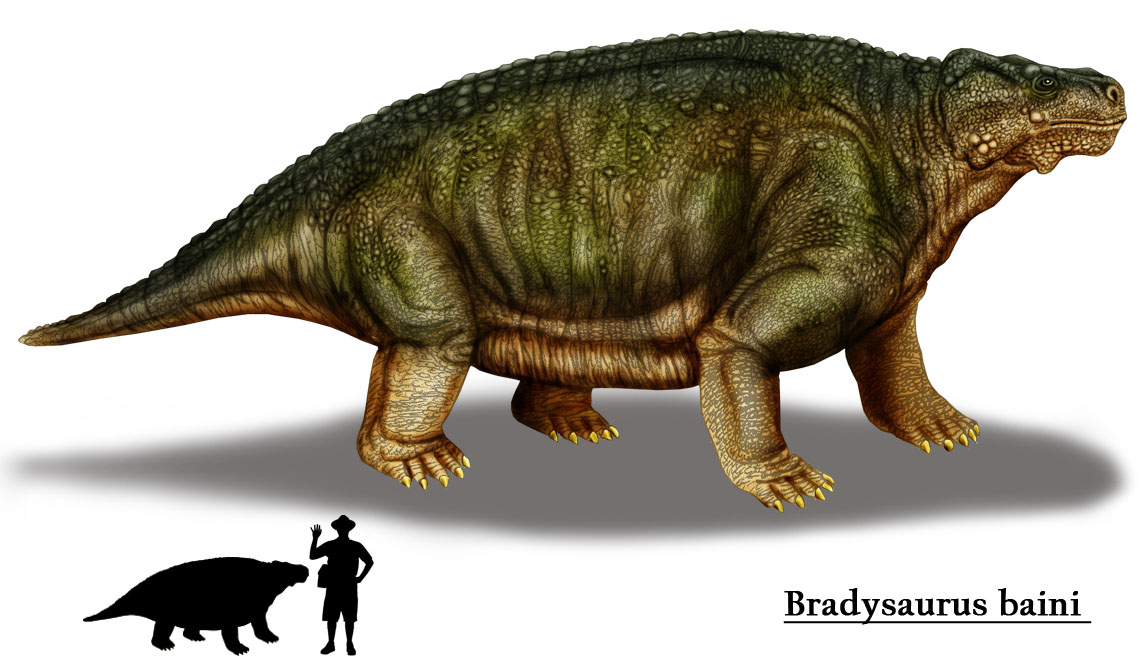
B. baini

Bradysaurus was 2.5–3 m (8 ft 2 in – 9 ft 10 in) in length, with a 2023 study estimating a body mass of 851.4–1,276.5 kilograms (1,877–2,814 lb) (average 1,022 kilograms (2,253 lb)), for Bradysaurus baini based on a virtual sculpted model, comparable to a cow and slightly smaller than Scutosaurus. The skull was large (about 42 to 48 centimeters long), broad and rounded at the front. It was coarsely sculptured and knobby, with the sutures between the bones not clearly visible.

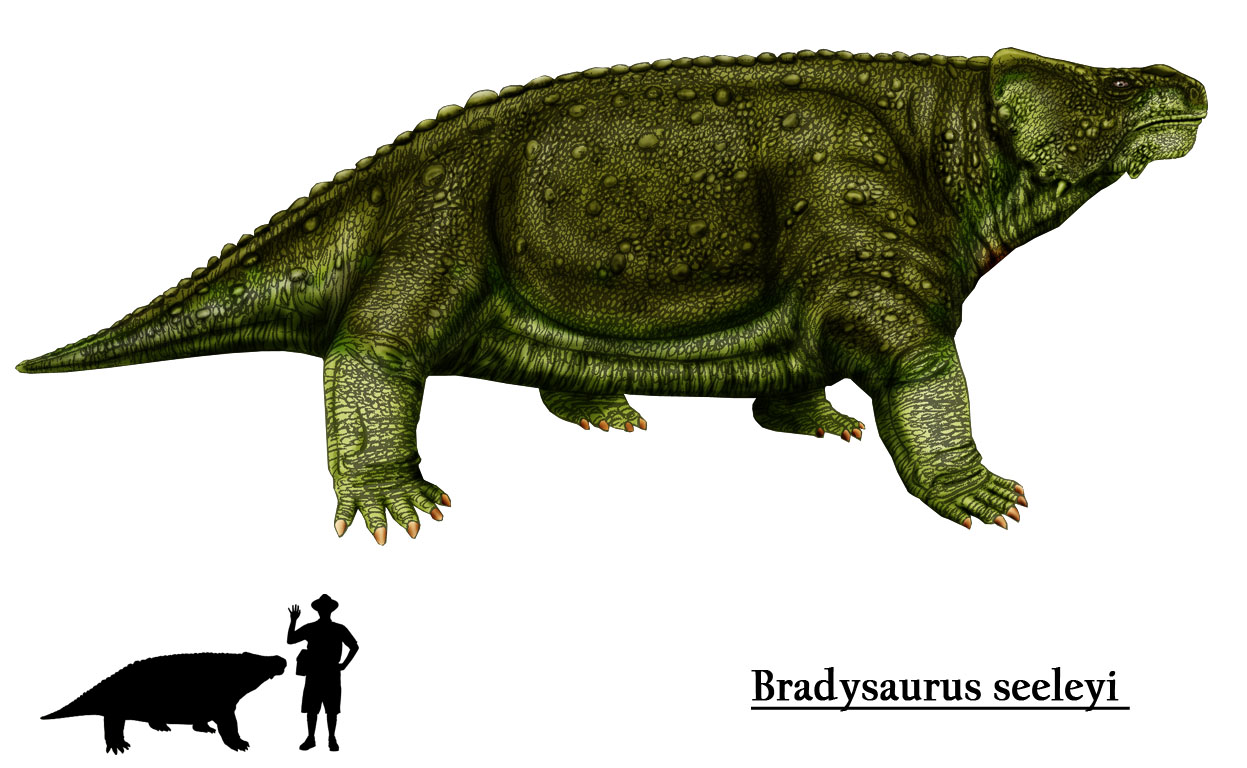
B. seeleyi

The marginal teeth were high-crowned, with only a few cusps, which is a primitive characteristic. The feet were short and broad, the phalangeal count being 2,3,3,3,2 on the fore-foot and 2,3,3,4,3 on the hind. The whole body is protected by dermal scutes, although these are not as thick or heavy as in more advanced forms.
