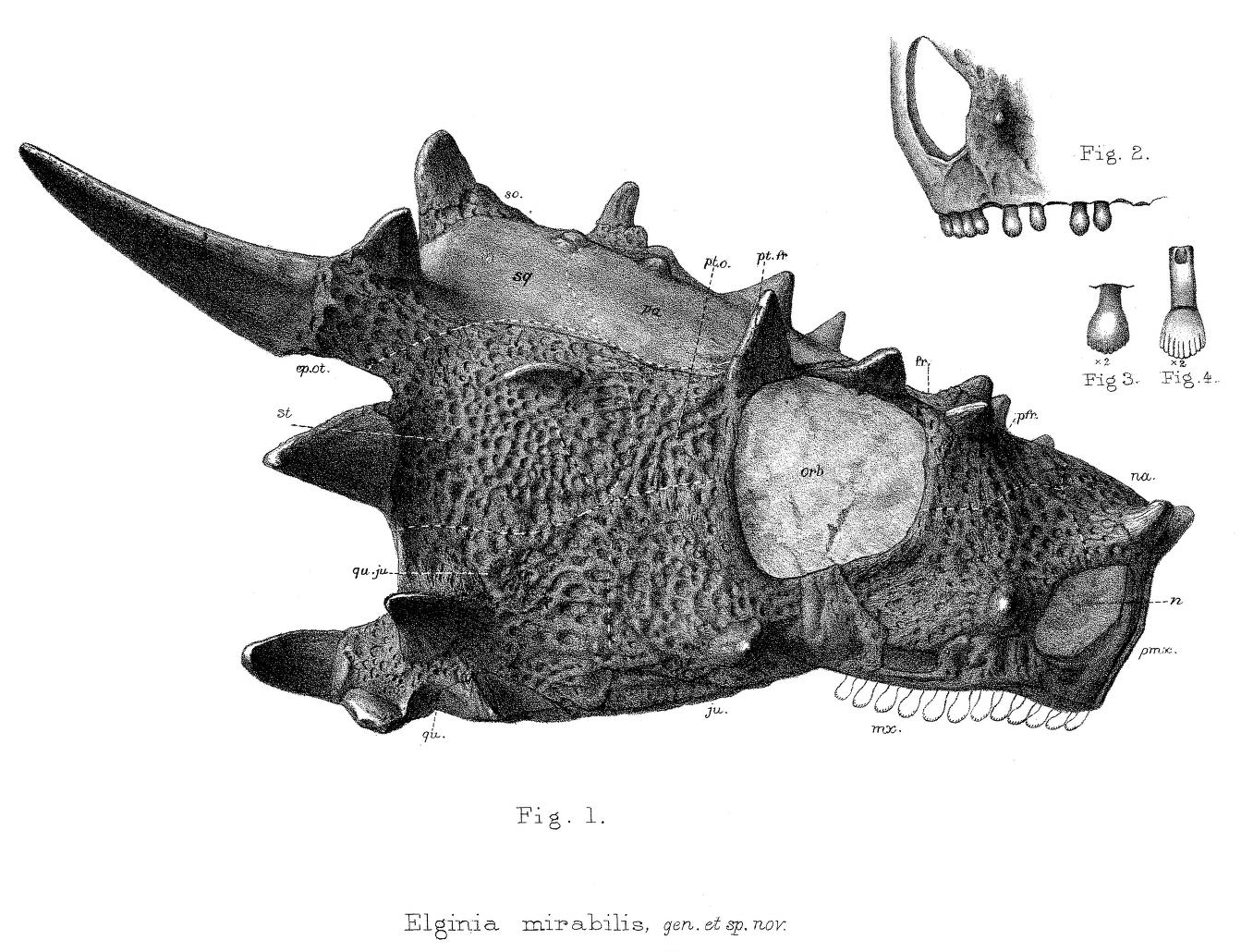
- The holotype skull of Elginia mirabilis as illustrated by Newton (1893), seen from the side.

Scientific classification
- Kingdom: Animalia
- Phylum: Chordata
- Class: Reptilia
- Clade: †Pareiasauria
- Family: †Pareiasauridae
- Genus: †Elginia; Newton, 1893

Type species
- †Elginia mirabilis Newton, 1893

Other species
- E. wuyongae, Liu & Bever, 2018

= Elginia =

Elginia Temporal range: Changhsingian, 254–252 Ma

Extinct genus of reptiles

Elginia is an extinct genus of pareiasaurid known from the Late Permian of Scotland and China. It was named for the area around Elgin in Scotland, which has yielded many fossils referred to as the Elgin Reptiles.

== Discovery ==
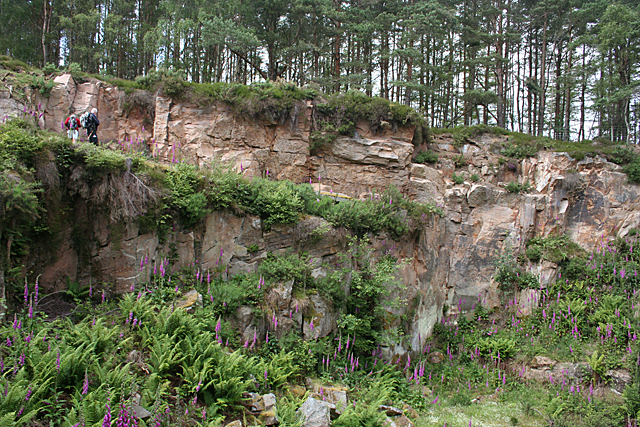
Fossils of Elginia mirabilis were recovered from the Cutties Hillock Quarry of Elgin, Scotland

The type species of Elginia, Elginia mirabilis, was first described in 1893 by E.T. Newton, after fellow geologists John Horne and Archibald Geikie informed him of several unusual specimens stored at the Elgin Museum in Scotland. The specimens were collected several years earlier from the coarse sandstones of the nearby Cutties Hillock Quarry. The quarry’s sandstone, the Cutties Hillock Sandstone Formation, is often (but not always) considered equivalent to the otherwise fossil-poor Hopeman Sandstone Formation of broader Scottish geology. Tetrapod remains occupy a narrow section of the sandstone, lying above a pebbly layer. The sandstones of Cutties Hillock were deposited at the very end of the Permian Period, based on a dicynodont fauna similar to that of the Daptocephalus Assemblage Zone of South Africa.

The tetrapod fossils of Elgin are rarely preserved as actual bone material, but instead as external molds within the sandstone. To reconstruct the original shape of the fossils, the sandstone had to be split open, revealing fine sand and metal oxides filling the cavities left by the original bones. Once the infill is prepared away, the cavities are used as molds for casts made of gutta-percha latex, which can then be removed and described as proxies for the original fossils.

Elginia mirabilis is known from a few of these types of fossils, now stored at museums in Elgin and Edinburgh. The holotype, GSE 4780-4788, is a jawless but otherwise well-preserved cranium. A pair of dorsal vertebrae (GSE 4791) and a slightly longer portion of backbone including the sacrum (EMS 1978/546-548) were both recovered near the skull. They may represent postcrania of Elginia or a related pareiasaur. Later referred specimens, RMS 1956 8.1 and 8.2, collectively represent large portions of a skeleton, including many postcranial elements. ELGNM 1978.560, a small partial skeleton first interpreted as the tail of Gordonia, and then as an indeterminate procolophonid, was described as a juvenile Elginia in 2000. A second species of Elginia, Elginia wuyongae, was described in 2018. It consists of IVPP V 23875, a partial skull and backbone collected from outcrops of the Naobaogou Formation near Baotou, China.

== Description ==
Elginia individuals were fairly small by pareiasaur standards. The holotype skull of E. mirabilis had a length of about 21 cm (8.3 inches) including the horns, or about 15 cm (6 inches) without them. Newton (1893) estimated that Elginia was about 90 cm (35.4 inches) long from the tip of the snout to the base of the tail, though knowledge of pareiasaurian postcrania was quite limited at the time. Spencer & Lee (2000) estimated that the adult E. mirabilis specimens could reach a total length of 1 meter (3.3 feet). The juvenile they described would have been one of the smallest known parareptile specimens, only 25 cm (9.8 inches) long.

=== Skull ===
==== General structure ====
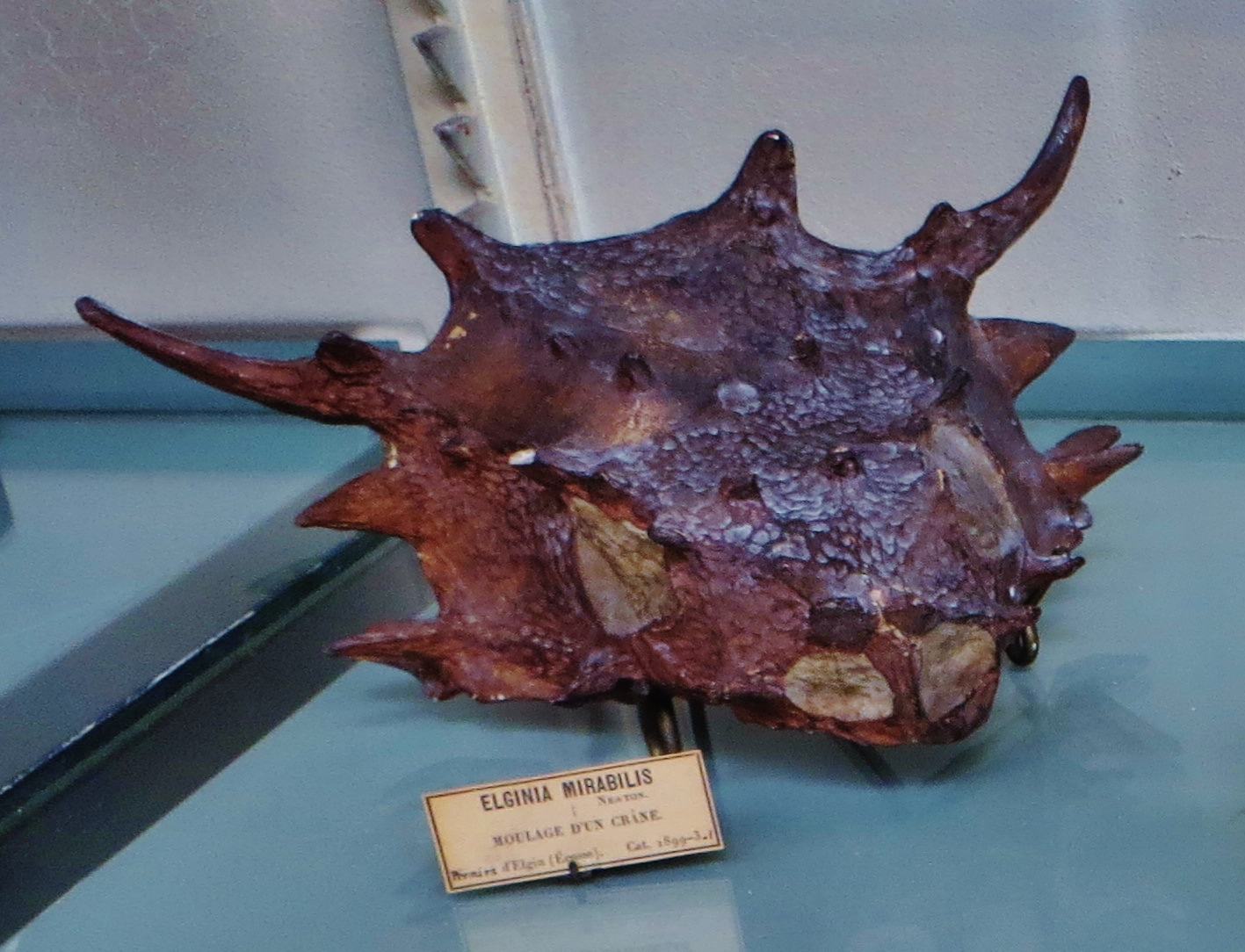
Elginia mirabilis skull cast

The skull of Elginia is fairly deep and strongly built, like other pareiasaurs. It has a triangular profile from above, with its rear edge about as wide as its front-to-back length, not counting the horns. Sutures on the skull are difficult to distinguish due to the fossil’s method of preservation, but a few conclusions can be reached. The premaxilla is one of the few smoothly textured bones, running between a pair of nares (nostril holes) which open towards the front. The snout is short, with small nasal bones above the nares and a deep maxilla behind them. The teeth are closely packed, attached to the edge of the skull with apparent pleurodont implantation. The teeth are leaf-shaped, with a long, narrow root and approximately nine large, rounded serrations on a pentagonal crown. There are an estimated 12 teeth on each side of the skull.

There seems to be a thin lacrimal above the maxilla. The orbit (eye socket) has sharp corners and a rear edge (formed by the postorbital) that is deeper than the front edge (formed by the prefrontal and lacrimal). The upper edge of the orbit, formed by the prefrontal and postfrontal bones, is straight in E. mirabilis and smoothly vaulted in E. wuyongae. The cheek region at the back of the skull is deep and sturdy, without any temporal fenestrae. It is divided into four rectangular bones, the postorbital (upper front), squamosal (upper rear), quadratojugal (lower rear) and the large rear part of the jugal (lower front). The jugal is hatchet-shaped, with a somewhat narrower front branch forming the lower edge of the orbit. The quadratojugal expands downwards to create a cheek flange, though Elginia’s cheek flange is less extreme than that of many other pareiasaurs.

A large pineal fossa is present midway down the skull roof. The pineal fossa was likely located at the front end of the broad, plate-like parietal bones. A small, isolated midline bone lies behind the parietals and is followed by a pair of much larger triangular bones, which lie at the rear edge of the skull. The isolated midline bone is likely a singular postparietal. This would make Elginia one of the few pareiasaurs with a postparietal separated from the rear edge of the skull. The supernumerary elements (larger bone pair) may be tabulars, though they may instead be osteoderms incorporated into the skull roof. They smoothly connect outwards to supratemporal bones, which themselves connect outwards to the squamosals.

==== Horns ====
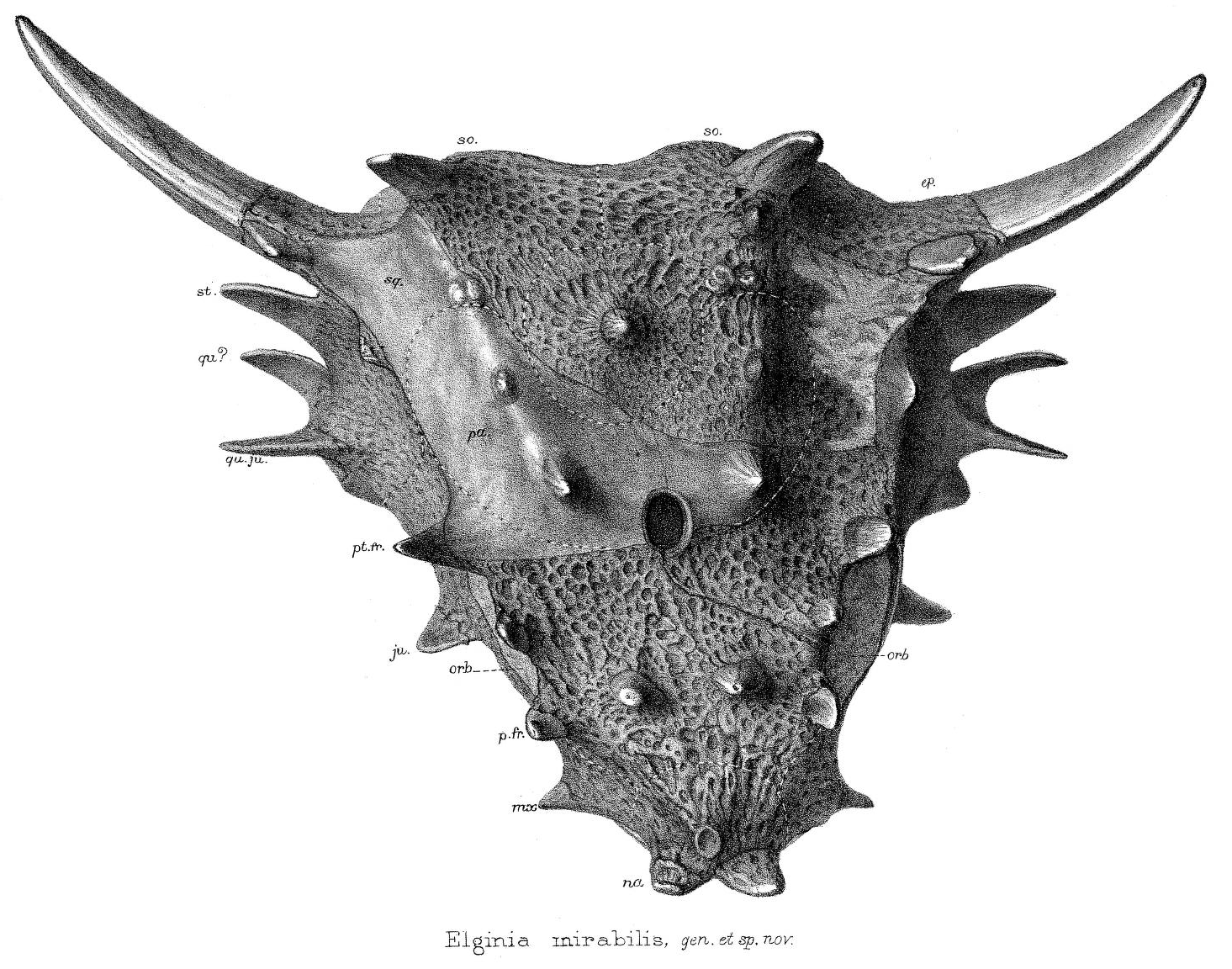
A top view of the holotype skull of Elginia mirabilis as illustrated by Newton (1893), showing the extravagant ornamentation of the skull

The most unique characteristic of Elginia is the elaborate array of spines and horns covering the skull. These horns are covered with grooves and ridges, indicating that they likely were extended by keratinous sheaths. Even in areas without prominent horns, the skull is roughly textured with small irregular bosses and rounded pits. In E. mirabilis, there are a total of 40 large protuberances on the skull, with 38 paired horns or bosses, and two lone median protuberances. One median spine would have been present at the tip of the snout, though it has broken off in the fossil, leaving behind a ‘crater-like’ depression. The other median protuberance was a large conical boss present on the parietal or postparietal, behind the pineal fossa.

The largest horns are a pair of elongated spines which curve backwards and outwards from the supratemporal bones. The elongated spines have a rounded outer edge and a flattened inner edge. Another supratemporal horn is present at each pedicel forming the base of the elongated horns. Each supernumerary element (tabular?) has a strong spike sticking upwards and curving slightly forwards, as well as at least one smaller boss in front of it. Each parietal has two pairs of horns: a larger one adjacent to the pineal fossa, and a smaller boss behind each of those horns. A horn is also present on each frontal, about midway between the pineal fossa and the tip of the snout.

The rear edge of the cheek region has two pairs of horns pointing backwards: a large, flattened horn on each squamosal and a smaller curved spine on each quadratojugal. Each quadratojugal also has three more spines: a sharply pointed spine directed outwards, and two small protuberances directed downwards. A flattened spine is also directed outwards from the middle of the squamosal. A low flattened spine is present on each jugal, just below and behind the orbit. A rounded boss is present on each maxilla, right behind the nares. Each nasal bone has a small, flattened horn overhanging the nares. Three horns are present on the upper edge of each orbit, likely lying on the prefrontal, postfrontal, and postorbital bones, respectively.

The skull of E. wuyongae is incomplete, but its ornamentation seems to be more subdued than that of E. mirabilis. The frontals have low bosses rather than sharp horns, and the parietals and postparietal seem fairly flat. The elongated supratemporal spines (and the smaller spines at their base) seem to have been present, but only their bases are preserved. This is also the case with the supernumerary elements (tabulars?), which have a fragmented boss in place of a large spine. The three horns above the orbit have been modified into large rectangular bosses, the largest being the middle (postfrontal) boss.

==== Braincase and palate ====
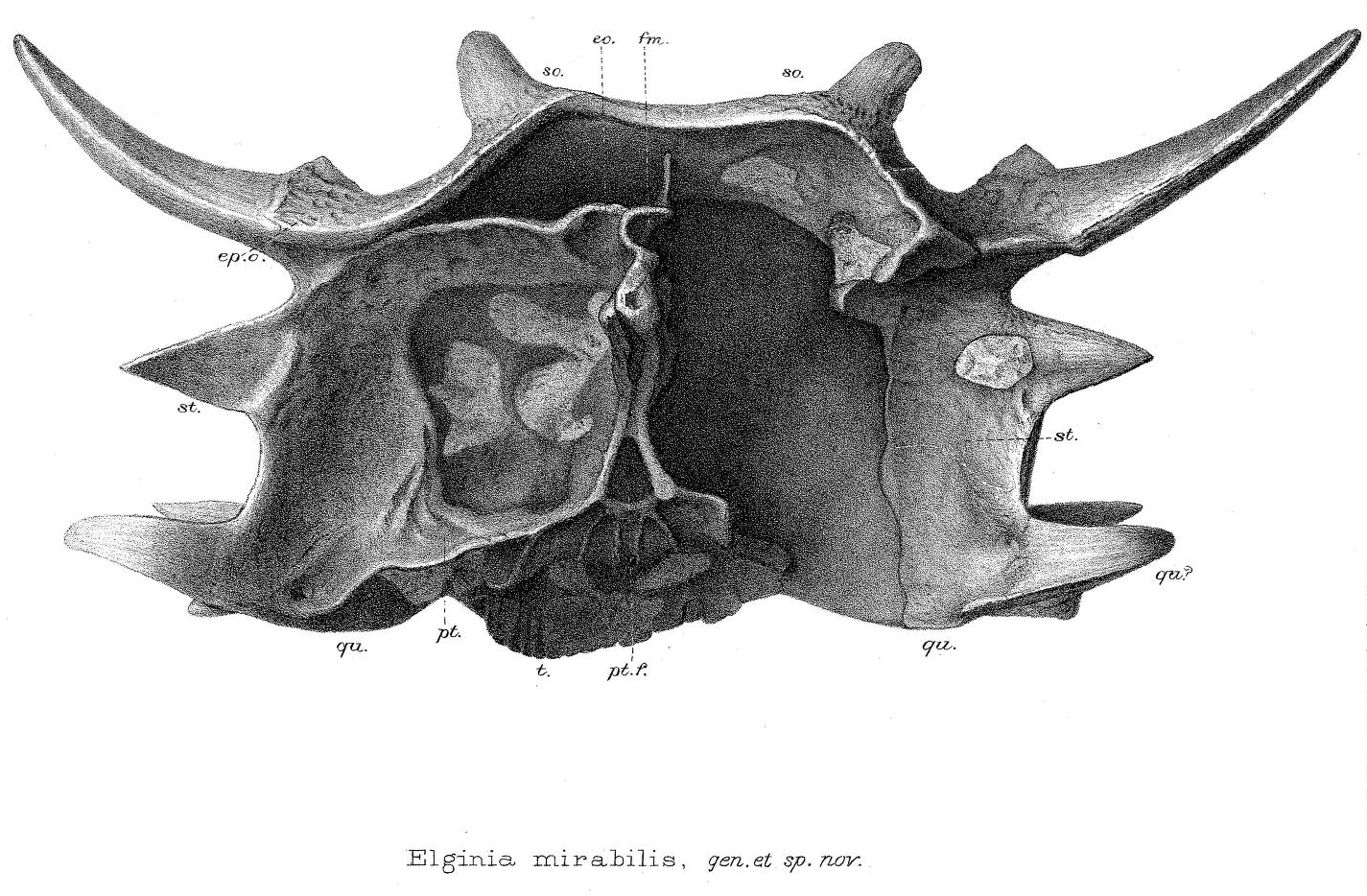
The holotype skull of Elginia mirabilis as illustrated by Newton (1893), seen from behind. Some of the braincase is eroded.

The foramen magnum of the braincase is wide, with its lower and outer margins primarily formed by fan-shaped exoccipital bones. The exoccipitals are connected to the outer skull roof by opisthotic bones. The opisthotics have the form of horizontally oriented buttresses which slightly curve upwards towards the squamosals. The basioccipital bone forms a small portion of the foramen magnum’s lower edge, as well as the occipital condyle. The basioccipital is tall, sending out two concave flanges which give it an upside-down V shape from behind. At its lower extent, the basioccipital connects to the parabasisphenoid bone, which forms the base of the braincase. The parabasisphenoid is unusually narrow in Elginia, tapering forwards before expanding slightly at its front extent. The basioccipital’s flanges (and the groove formed between them) gradually diminish as they extend onto the parabasisphenoid.

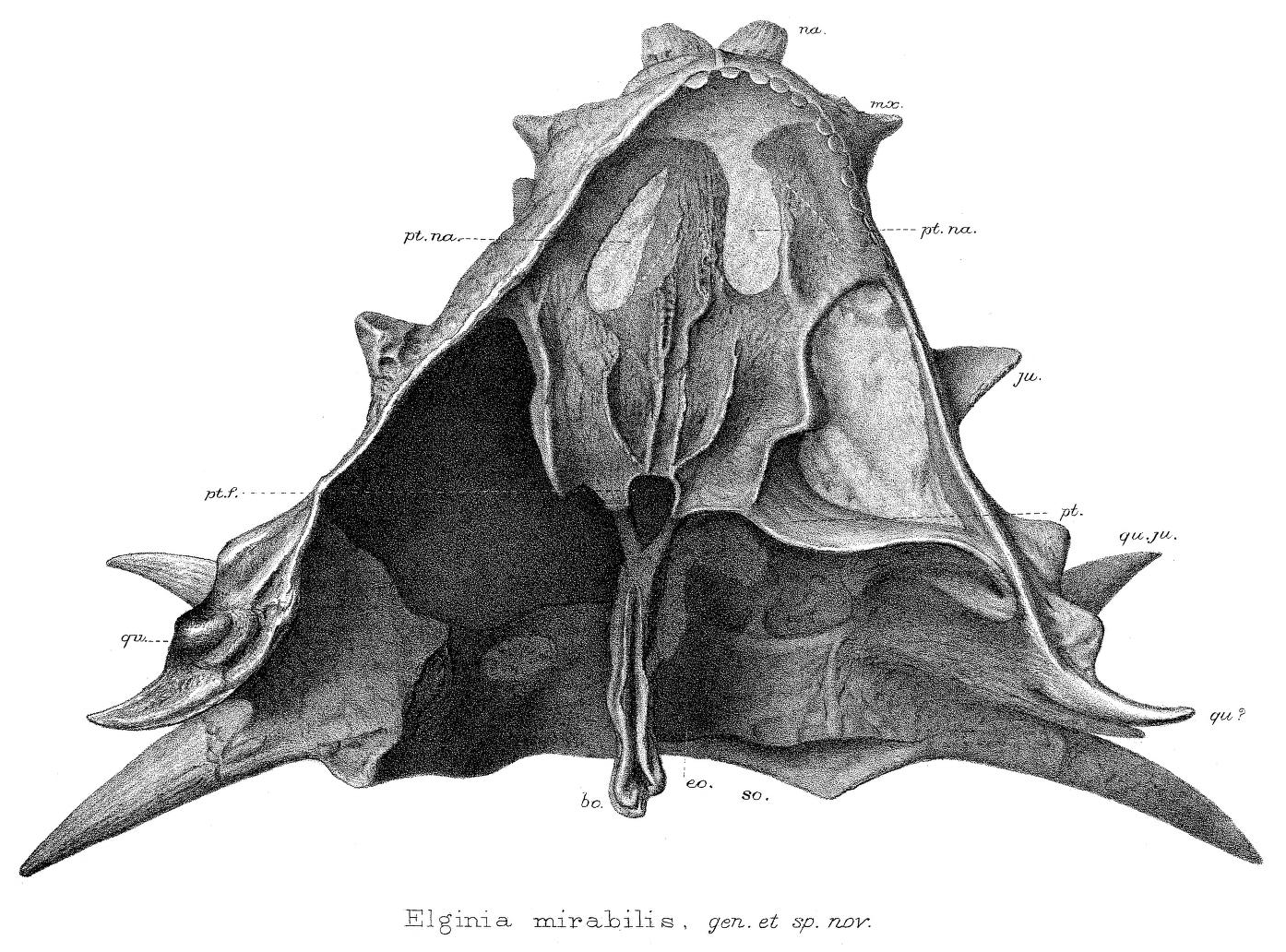
The holotype skull of Elginia mirabilis as illustrated by Newton (1893), seen from below. Some of the palate and braincase is eroded.

The parabasisphenoid terminates at a small teardrop-shaped hole, the interpterygoid vacuity. Bones of the palate (roof of the mouth) lie ahead of this hole. The palate is broad, though the sutures of its component bones are difficult to assess. There are two large choanae (internal nares) near the front; they have rounded rear edges and tapering front edges. The rear of the palatal plate is formed by the transverse flange of the pterygoid. The transverse flange is sinuous and extends as far back as the quadrate bones of the skull roof. A large, heart-shaped hole lies in front of the transverse flange. Four ridges, which likely supported teeth, run down the middle of the palate. The two inner ridges extend as far forwards as the choanae, while the two outer ridges are slightly curved and terminate behind the choanae. Additional sharp ridges, which seem to be toothless, lie along the heart-shaped holes defined by the pterygoids.

=== Postcranial skeleton ===
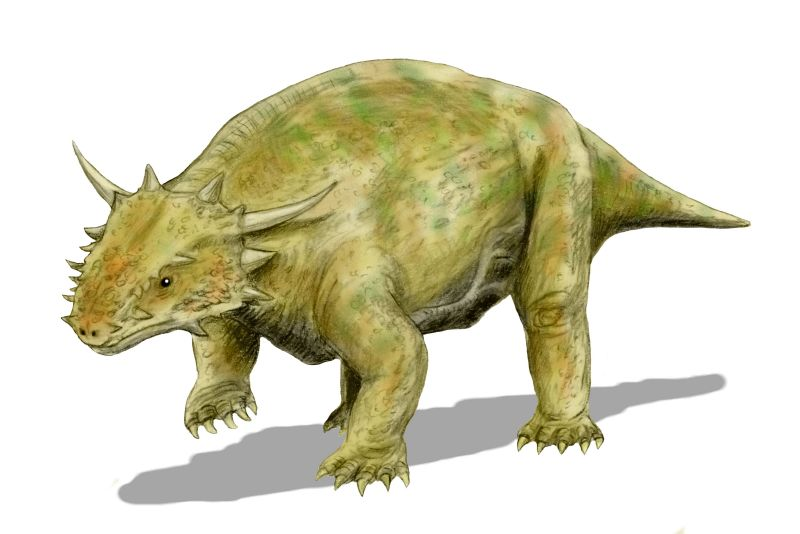
Life restoration of Elginia mirabilis, showing its typical pareiasaurian body type

The postcranial morphology of Elginia is fairly typical among pareiasaurs, with a robust body and short tail. The vertebrae are amphicoelous (concave on both ends), with swollen neural arches and short neural spines. Large zygapophyses give the vertebrae a ‘butterfly-shaped’ profile when seen from above. The dorsal ribs are long and curved, with chisel-shaped tips. They attach to the vertebrae via transverse processes which sweep backwards and upwards. In E. wuyongae, a flange connects the transverse processes to the postzygapophyses, while in E. mirabilis the structures are separate. The sacral vertebrae are flattened from the side and have large sacral ribs which weakly contact the ilium. The caudal ribs are mostly straight, only slightly downturned at the tips. Large, densely packed osteoderms cover much of the torso. These osteoderms each have a spine-like central boss from which many irregular ridges radiate out. Smaller stud-like osteoderms were certainly present on the thigh and possibly other parts of the limbs, though they may have been accidentally removed during fossil preparation. The juvenile specimen described by Spencer & Lee (2000) completely lacks osteoderms.

The scapula is somewhat long and plate-like, with a lateral ridge leading to a strong acromion process. There was no evidence of a cleithrum. The humerus had a wide lower end, but its joint surfaces did not project far outwards. The entepicondyle of the humerus seems to possess an entepicondylar foramen as well as a strong ridge delimiting the trochlea. The ilium is similar to that of Scutosaurus, with a long rear blade as well as a somewhat large front blade strongly inclined upwards and outwards. The femoral head bends slightly upwards and forwards. A crest-like postaxial flange runs down the entire rear edge of the femur, narrowing in the middle and projecting horizontally. The underside of the femur has a long and curved internal trochanter. A prominent longitudinal ridge, the cnemial crest, is present on the tibia.

== Classification ==
As with many pareiasaurs, precise phylogenetic placement is uncertain. Elginia shares with Scutosaurus elaborate cranial ornament, which has been used to suggest the two were closely related. Elginia has also been hypothesized to share a relationship with the more basal taxon Dolichopareia (=Nochelesaurus) on the basis of a deeply notched skull table shared with the latter, however other authors have argued that this association was based on taphonomic distortion. Cladistic analyses have tended to nest Elginia deeper among pareiasaurs, making it more derived than the earlier giant Pareiasaurus and Scutosaurus. The placement of Elginia remains volatile, with the taxon hopping between more apical pareiasaurs such as Therischian and more basal pareiasaurs such as Scutosaurus and pumiliopareiasaurs.

Cladogram after Li & Yun, 2025:

- Pareiasauria
  - Bradysauria
    - Embrithosaurus
    - - Bradysaurus
      - Nochelesaurus
  - - Bunostegos
    - - Honania
      - - Deltavjatia
        - - - - "Shihtienfenia" completus
              - Yinshanosaurus
            - Pumiliopareiasauria
              - Provelosaurus
              - - Nanoparia
                - - Anthodon
                  - Pumiliopareia
          - Therischia
            - - Pareiasuchus spp.
              - - Huanghesaurus
                - Shansisaurus
                - Shihtienfenia permica
            - - Pareiasaurus
              - Scutosaurus
              - Elginiidae
                - Arganaceras
                - Elginia mirabilis
                - Elginia wuyongae
                - Obirkovia
