= Sunjiagou Formation =

Geological formation in Shanxi, China

- Stratigraphic range: Late Wuchiapingian-earliest Induan
- Type: Geological formation
- Unit of: Shiqianfeng Group
- Underlies: Liujiagou Formation
- Overlies: Shangshihezi Formation
- Thickness: 100-200 metres

Lithology
- Primary: Sandstone, Siltstone, Mudstone

Location
- Country: China
- Extent: Shanxi

The Sunjiagou Formation is a geological formation in Shanxi, China. It is of Lopingian age. The lower and middle parts of the formation consists of intensely bioturbated fine grained sandstones and thinly interbedded mudstones, deposited in a shallow-shore lake depositional environment, while the upper part consists of fine grained sandstone, siltstone and mudstone. Alongside the Naobaogou Formation, it has provided an important vertebrate fauna.

== Paleobiota ==
Genus	Species	Material	Notes
Sanchuansaurus	S. pygmaeus		Pareiasaur
Shihtienfenia	S. permica		Pareiasaur
"Shihtienfenia"	Y. completus	A skull	A pareiasaur; named as a species of Shihtienfenia but later regarded as more closely related to the coeval Yinshanosaurus.
Seroherpeton	S. yangquanensis	right upper jaw and palate	Embolomeri
Taoheodon	T. baizhijuni		Dicynodont
Yinshanosaurus	Y. angustus	A skull	Pareiasaur
Cryptodontia	Indeterminate	Partial skull	Dicynodont
