= Salarevo Formation =

Geologic formation in Russia

- Stratigraphic range: Permian; ~264.28–256.8 Ma
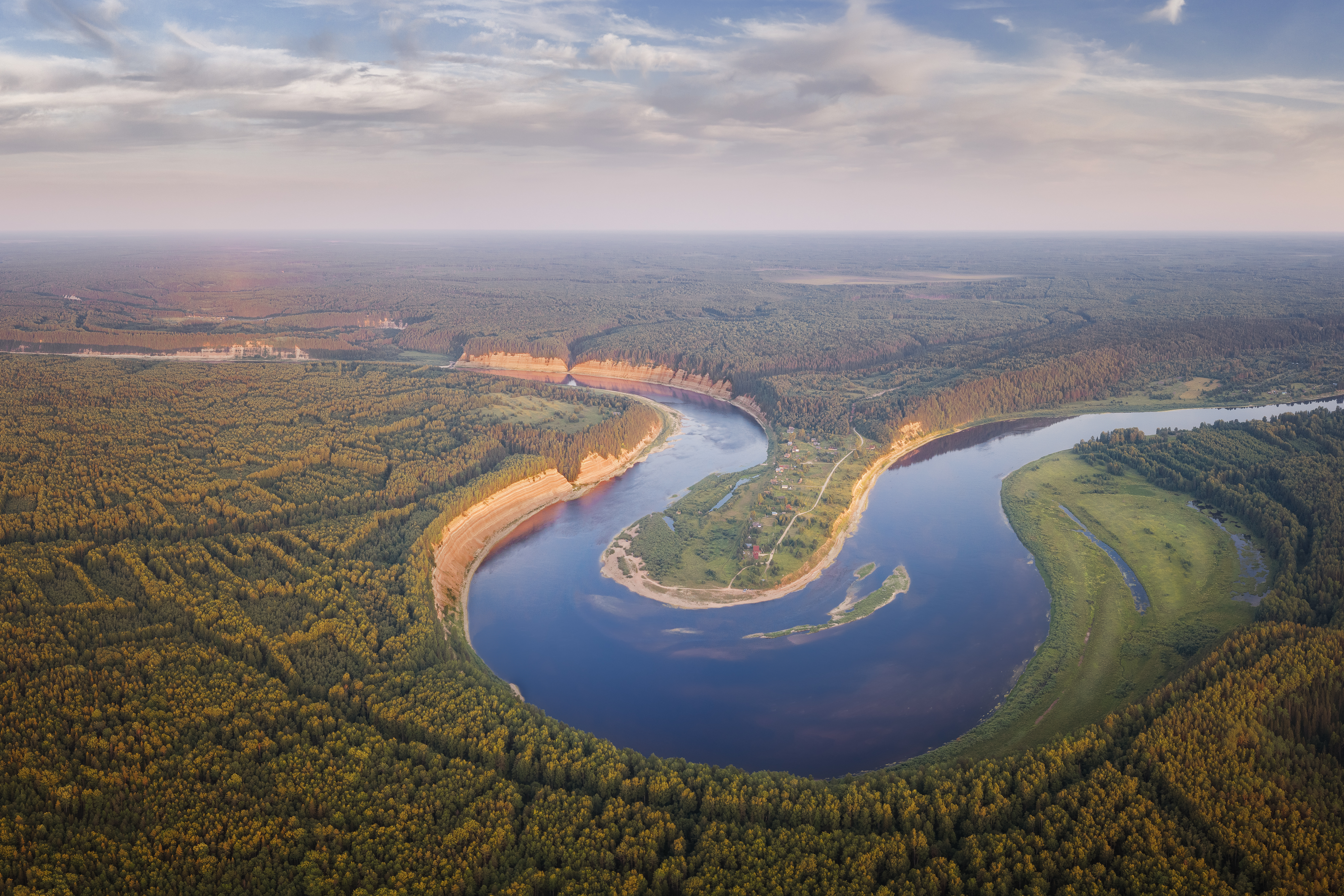
- The geological outcrop of Sukhona River where fossils are discovered
- Type: Geological formation

Lithology
- Primary: Conglomerate

Location
- Coordinates: 61.2°N 46.6°E
- Approximate paleocoordinates: 39.7°N 46.9°E
- Region: Arkhangelsk Oblast; Vologda Oblast
- Country: Russia
- Extent: Severnaya Dvina basin
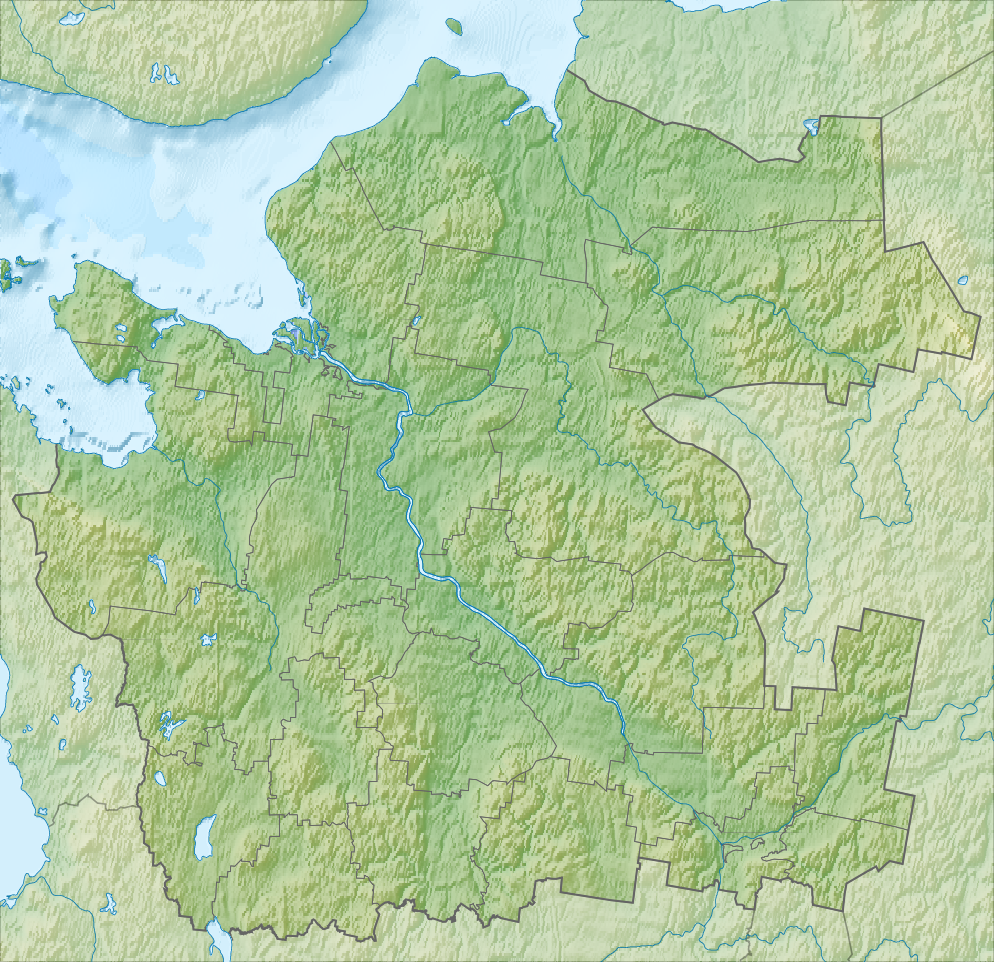
- Salarevo Formation (Russia) Salarevo Formation (Arkhangelsk Oblast)

The Salarevo Formation is a geological formation located in Arkhangelsk Oblast and Vologda Oblast of Western Russia. Fossils of the Sokolki Assemblage Zone have been found recovered from this formation, including those of pareiasaurs, dicynodonts, gorgonopsians, and therocephalians.

== Paleofauna ==
=== Amphibians ===
Color key: Taxon / Reclassified taxon / Taxon falsely reported as present / Dubious taxon or junior synonym / Ichnotaxon / Ootaxon / Morphotaxon	Notes; Uncertain or tentative taxa are in small text; ~~crossed out~~ taxa are discredited.

Amphibians of the Salarevo Formation
Taxon	Species	Location	Stratigraphic position	Material	Notes	Images
Dvinosaurus	D. primus	Zavrazhye and Sokolki	Upper	A partial skeleton	A temnospondyl	

=== Synapsids ===
Synapsids of the Salarevo Formation
Taxon	Species	Location	Stratigraphic position	Material	Notes	Images
Annatherapsidus	A. petri	Sokolki	Upper	A skull	A therocephalian	
Dvinia	D. prima	Sokolki	Upper	A partial skull (an anterior half of the skull without the lower jaw)	A cynodont	
Elph	E. borealis	Sokolki and Zavrazhy	Upper	A partial skull missing part of the premaxilla, zygomatic arches, right quadrate, and postdentary part of mandible	A dicynodont	
Inostrancevia	I. alexandri	Sokolki	Upper	A skeleton	A gorgonopsid	
Inostrancevia	I. latifrons	Sokolki and Zavrazhye	Upper	A skull	A gorgonopsid	
Peramodon	P. amalitzkii	Sokolki	Upper	A partial skeleton	A dicynodont	
Pravoslavlevia	P. parva	Sokolki	Upper	A skull	A gorgonopsid	
Vivaxosaurus	V. trautscholdi	Sokolki and Zavrazhye	Upper	A skull	A dicynodont	

=== Sauropsids ===
Sauropsids of the Salarevo Formation
Taxon	Species	Location	Stratigraphic position	Material	Notes	Images
Obirkovia	O. gladiator	Obirkovo	Upper	A partial skull	A pareiasaur	
Scutosaurus	S. karpinskii	Sokolki	Upper	A fully preserved skeleton	A large pareiasaur	

=== Other reptiliomorphs ===
Non-amniote reptiliomorphs of the Salarevo Formation
Taxon	Species	Location	Stratigraphic position	Material	Notes	Images
Chroniosuchus	C. vjuschkovi	Zavrazhye	Upper	Specimen	A reptiliomorph of uncertain affinities	
Karpinskiosaurus	K. secundus	Sokolki	Upper	A skeleton	A seymouriamorph	
Kotlassia	K. prima	Sokolki	Upper	A complete skeleton with one additional skull	A kotlassiid seymouriamorph	
