= Sanchuansaurus =

Sanchuansaurus Temporal range: Late Permian, Changhsingian

Scientific classification
- Domain: Eukaryota
- Kingdom: Animalia
- Phylum: Chordata
- Clade: †Parareptilia
- Order: †Procolophonomorpha
- Clade: †Pareiasauria
- Clade: †Velosauria
- Genus: †Sanchuansaurus
- Species: †S. pygmaeus

Binomial name
- †Sanchuansaurus pygmaeus Gao, 1988

Genus of extinct pareiasaur reptiles

Sanchuansaurus is an extinct genus of pareiasaur from the late Permian Sunjiagou Formation of China. The genus contains a single species, S. pygmaeus, known from a partial maxilla and left leg bones. A 2013 study suggested that both Sanchuansaurus and another Chinese pareiasaur, Huanghesaurus, were synonymous with Shansisaurus. However, this has not been followed in future research, with later papers considering Sanchuansaurus to be distinct, with Huanghesaurus and Shansisaurus possibly being synonymous with Shihtienfenia, another Chinese pareiasaur.
