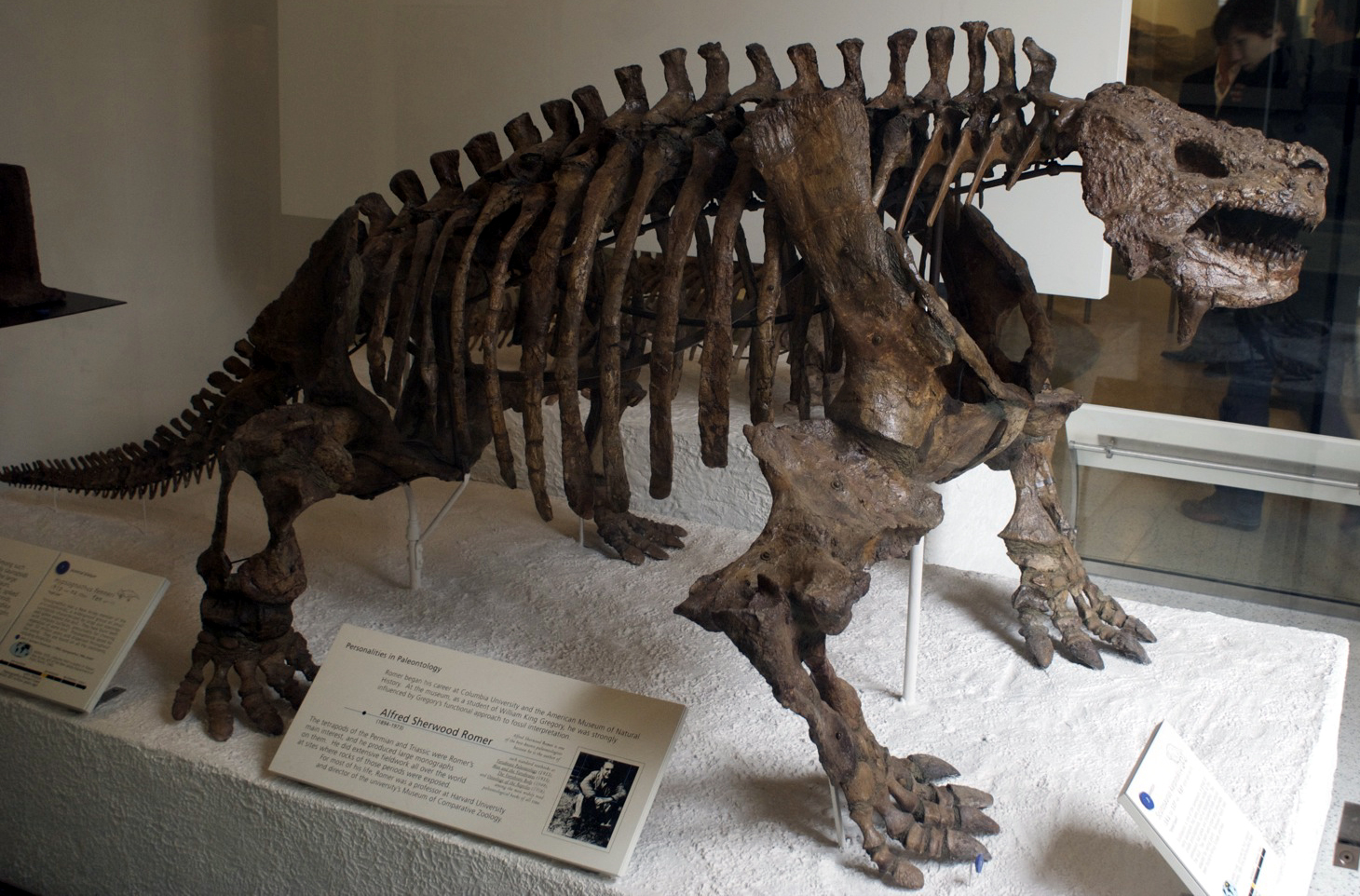
- Skeleton of Scutosaurus karpinskii in the American Museum of Natural History

Scientific classification
- Kingdom: Animalia
- Phylum: Chordata
- Class: Reptilia
- Superfamily: †Pareiasauroidea
- Clade: †Pareiasauria; Seeley, 1888

Genera
- †Bunostegos; †Deltavjatia; †Honania; †Parasaurus; †Senectosaurus; †Yinshanosaurus; †Bradysauria; †Bradysaurus; †Embrithosaurus; †Nochelesaurus; †Velosauria; †Pumiliopareiasauria; †Anthodon; †Nanopareia; †Provelosaurus; †Pumiliopareia; †Therischia; †Pareiasaurus; †Pareiasuchus; †Sanchuansaurus; †Scutosaurus; †Shansisaurus; †Shihtienfenia; †Elgininiidae; †Arganaceras; †Elginia; †Obirkovia

Synonyms
- Pareiasauridae?

= Pareiasauria =

Pareiasauria Temporal range: Middle Permian - Late Permian, 265–252 Ma

Extinct clade of reptiles

Pareiasauria (meaning "cheek lizards") is an extinct clade of large, herbivorous neoreptilians (traditionally considered "parareptiles") that existed during the Permian period. Pareiasaurs were armoured with osteoderms which covered large areas of the body. They first appeared in southern Pangea during the Middle Permian, before becoming globally distributed during the Late Permian. Pareiasaurs were the largest reptiles of the Permian, some reaching sizes over 1 tonne (2,200 lb), equivalent to the largest contemporary therapsids. Pareiasaurs became extinct in the end-Permian mass extinction event.

== Description ==
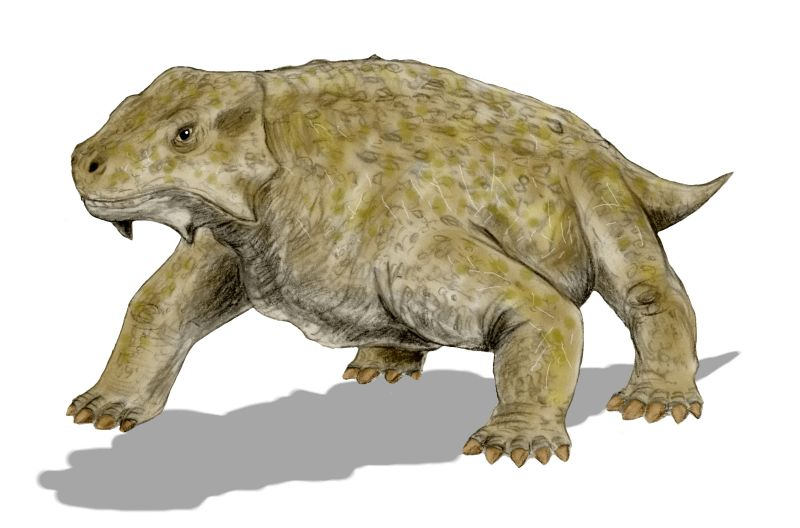
Restoration of Bradysaurus

Size of Scutosaurus, one of the largest pareiasaurs, compared to a human

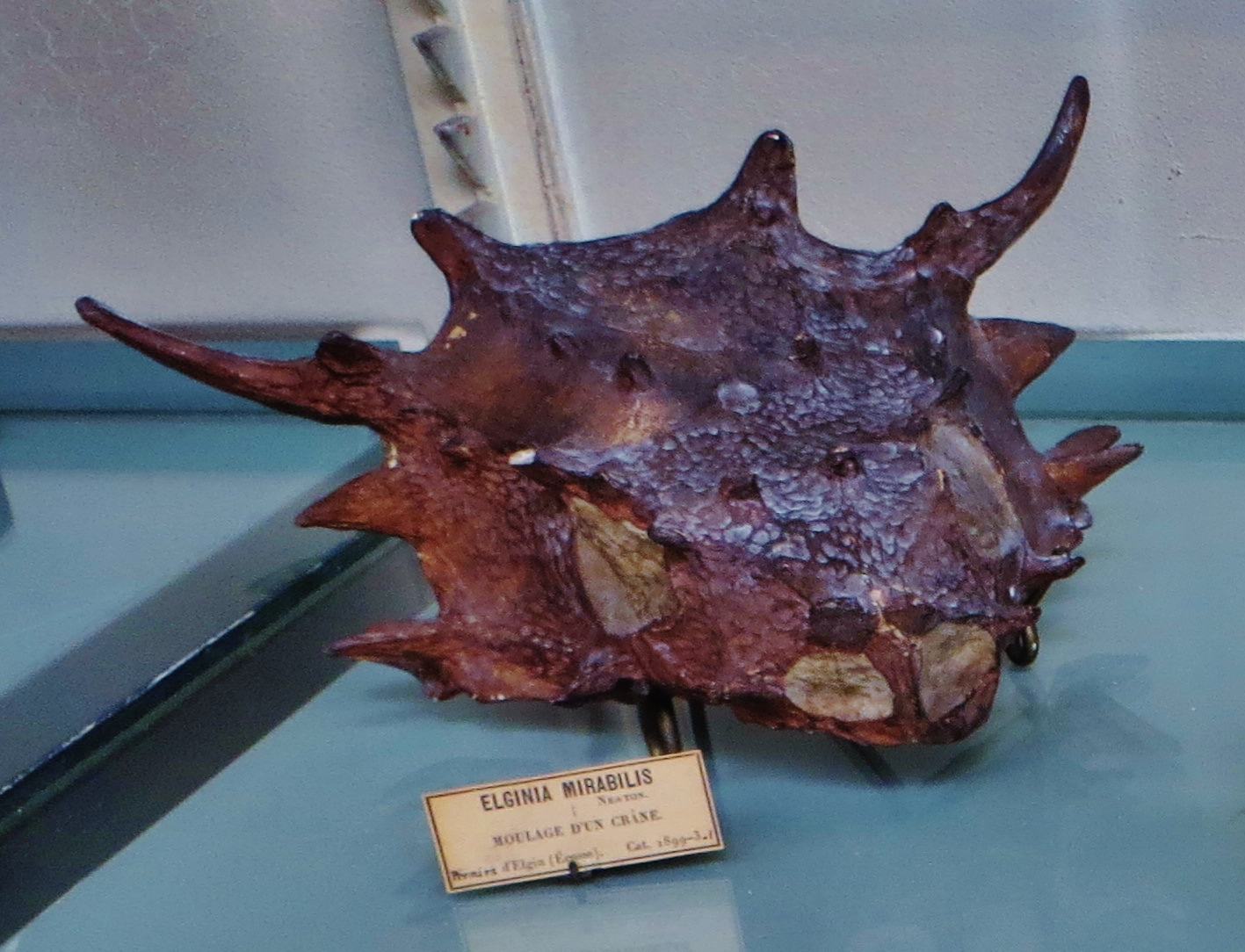
Heavily ornamented skull of Elginia mirabilis

Pareiasaurs ranged in size from 60 to 300 centimetres (2.0 to 9.8 ft) long, with the largest pareiasaurs like Scutosaurus and Bradysaurus estimated to exceed 1,000 kilograms (2,200 lb) in body mass. The limbs of many parieasaurs were extremely robust, likely to account for the increased stress on their limbs caused by their typically sprawling posture. The cow-sized Bunostegos differed from other pareiasaurs by having a more upright limb posture, being amongst the first amniotes to develop this trait. Pareiasaurs were protected by bony scutes called osteoderms that were set into the skin. Their skulls were heavily ornamented with bosses, rugose ridges, and bumps. Their leaf-shaped multi-cusped teeth resemble those of iguanas, indicating a herbivorous diet. The body probably housed an extensive digestive tract. Most authors have assumed a terrestrial lifestyle for pareiasaurs. A 2008 bone microanatomy study suggested a more aquatic, plausibly amphibious lifestyle, but a later 2019 study found that the bone histology provided no direct evidence of this lifestyle, a conclusion also supported by a 2014 isotopic study, which found support for a terrestrial ecology.

== Evolutionary history ==
Among reptilian groups, pareiasaurs are thought to be most closely related to the nycteroleterids as part of the clade Pareiasauromorpha. Pareiasaurs filled the large herbivore niche (or guild) that had been occupied early in the Permian period by the caseid pelycosaurs and, before them, the diadectid reptiliomorphs. They are much larger than the diadectids, more similar to the giant caseid pelycosaur Cotylorhynchus. Although the last Pareiasaurs were no larger than the first types (indeed, many of the last ones became smaller), there was a definite tendency towards increased armour as the group developed. Pareiasaurs first appeared in the fossil record in the Middle Permian (Guadalupian) of Southern Pangaea, before dispersing into Northern Pangaea and gaining a cosmopolitan distribution during the Late Permian (Lopingian). Pareiasaurs abruptly became extinct as part of the Permian-Triassic mass extinction event at the end of the Permian.

== Classification ==
Some paleontologists considered that pareiasaurs were direct ancestors of modern turtles. Pareiasaur skulls have several turtle-like features, and in some species the scutes have developed into bony plates, possibly the precursors of a turtle shell. Jalil and Janvier, in a large analysis of pareiasaur relationships, also found turtles to be close relatives of the "dwarf" pareiasaurs, such as Pumiliopareia. However, the discovery of Pappochelys argues against a potential pareisaurian relationship to turtles, and DNA evidence indicates that living turtles are more closely related to living archosaurs than lepidosaurs, and therefore cladistically diapsids.

Pareiasaurs are currently generally considered to be an earlier branch of the reptilian family tree that diverged before the common ancestor of living reptiles including turtles. Pareiasaurs were long historically included with many other primitive reptiles in the group "Parareptilia", but recent research has questioned the validity of this group.

=== Associated clades ===
Hallucicrania (Lee 1995): This clade was coined by MSY Lee for Lanthanosuchidae + (Pareiasauridae + Testudines). Lee's pareiasaur hypothesis has become untenable due to the diapsid features of the stem turtle Pappochelys and the potential testudinatan nature of Eunotosaurus. Recent cladistic analyses reveal that lanthanosuchids have a much more basal position in the Procolophonomorpha, and that the nearest sister taxon to the pareiasaurs are the rather unexceptional and conventional looking nycteroleterids (Müller & Tsuji 2007, Lyson et al. 2010) the two being united in the clade Pareiasauromorpha (Tsuji et al. 2012).

Pareiasauroidea (Nopcsa, 1928): This clade (as opposed to the superfamily or suborder Pareiasauroidea) was used by Lee (1995) for Pareiasauridae + Sclerosaurus. More recent cladistic studies place Sclerosaurus in the procolophonid subfamily Leptopleuroninae (Cisneros 2006, Sues & Reisz 2008), which means the similarities with pareiasaurs are the result of convergences.

Pareiasauria (Seeley, 1988): If neither Lanthanosuchidae or Testudines are included in the clade, the Pareiasauria only contains the monophyletic family Pareiasauridae.

=== Phylogeny ===
Cladogram after Simões et al. 2022

- Reptilia
  - †Acleistorhinidae
  - - †Millerettidae
    - - †Mesosauria
      - - †Procolophonia (incl. Pareiasauria)
        - Neodiapsida
          - †Younginiformes
          - - †Eunotosaurus
            - - †Weigeltisauridae
              - Sauria
                - Lepidosauromorpha
                  - Rhynchocephalia (tuatara and their extinct relatives)
                  - Squamata (lizards and snakes)
                - Archelosauria
                  - Pantestudines (turtles and extinct relatives)
                  - Archosauromorpha
                    - - †Ichthyosauromorpha
                      - - †Sauropterygia
                        - †Thalattosauria
                    - - †Protorosauria
                        - †Protorosauridae
                        - - †Tanystropheidae
                          - - †Drepanosauromorpha
                            - †Kuehneosauridae
                      - - - †Allokotosauria
                          - †Rhynchosauria
                        - Archosauriformes (crocodiles, birds, and their extinct relatives)

Cladogram of Reptilia after Jenkins et al 2025, with orange bars highlighting taxa formerly considered parareptiles:

- Reptilia/Sauropsida
  - †Araeoscelidia
  - - †Bolosauridae
    - Neoreptilia
      - †Ankyramorpha
        - †Acleistorhinidae
        - Procolophonia
          - †Pareiasauromorpha (incl. Pareiasauria)
          - †Procolophonoidea
      - - †Mesosauridae
        - - - †Cabarzia
            - - †Ascendonanus
              - †Orovenator
          - Parapleurota
            - †Millerettidae
            - Neodiapsida
              - †Younginidae
              - - †Tangasauridae
                - - †Weigeltisauridae
                  - - †Claudiosaurus
                    - Sauria
                      - Lepidosauromorpha
                      - Archosauromorpha

In 2025, Jian Yi and Jun Liu described Yinshanosaurus as a new Chinese pareiasaur based on two well-preserved, nearly complete skulls and an incomplete, partially articulated skeleton. Their publication included a phylogenetic analysis of pareiasaurs, the results of which are displayed in the cladogram below:

- Pareiasauria
  - Bradysauria
    - Embrithosaurus
    - - Bradysaurus
      - Nochelesaurus
  - - Bunostegos
    - - Honania
      - - Deltavjatia
        - - - - "Shihtienfenia" completus
              - Yinshanosaurus
            - Pumiliopareiasauria
              - Provelosaurus
              - - Nanoparia
                - - Anthodon
                  - Pumiliopareia
          - Therischia
            - - Pareiasuchus spp.
              - - Huanghesaurus
                - Shansisaurus
                - Shihtienfenia permica
            - - Pareiasaurus
              - Scutosaurus
              - Elginiidae
                - Arganaceras
                - Elginia mirabilis
                - Elginia wuyongae
                - Obirkovia
