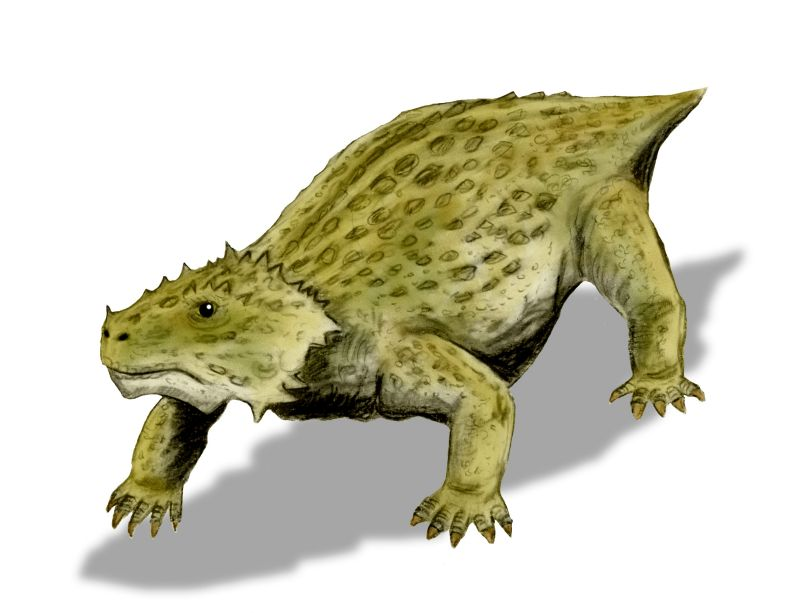
- Life restoration of Pumiliopareia pricei

Scientific classification
- Kingdom: Animalia
- Phylum: Chordata
- Class: Reptilia
- Clade: †Pareiasauria
- Genus: †Pumiliopareia; Lee, 1997

Type species
- †Nanoparia pricei Broom and Robinson, 1948

Synonyms
- Nanoparia pricei Broom and Robinson, 1948; Pareiasaurus pricei Broom and Robinson, 1948

= Pumiliopareia =

Pumiliopareia Temporal range: Changhsingian, 254–252 Ma

Extinct genus of reptiles

Pumiliopareia is an extinct genus of pareiasaurid from the Permian period of South Africa. It is known from a complete skeleton with osteoderms.

== Description ==
Pumiliopareia was about 50 cm (19.6 in) in length with a 12 cm (4.7 in) skull. It is the smallest known member of the pareiasaurs, measuring only a fifth as long as some of its larger relatives. Like Anthodon, its body was entirely covered with osteoderms.

== Classification ==
Originally included under the genus Nanoparia, it was given its own name by Lee 1997 who found it did not form a clade with Nanoparia luckhoffi, the type species of that genus, and preferred to have monophyletic genera.
