= Provelosaurus =

Provelosaurus Temporal range: Capitanian ~260 Ma

Scientific classification
- Kingdom: Animalia
- Phylum: Chordata
- Class: Reptilia
- Subclass: †Parareptilia
- Order: †Procolophonomorpha
- Clade: †Pareiasauria
- Family: †Pareiasauridae
- Genus: †Provelosaurus; Lee, 1997

Type species
- †Pareiasaurus americanus Araújo, 1985

Synonyms
- Pareiasaurus americanus Araújo, 1985

Extinct genus of reptiles

Provelosaurus is an extinct Pareiasaur genus of the Late Permian found on the road between Aceguá and Bagé in the Paleorrota, Rio Grande do Sul, Brazil. Found in the Rio do Rasto Formation, aged about 260 million years. The holotype specimen found measures 1.2 metres (3 ft 11 in) in length.

== Classification ==
Originally described as a South American representative of the genus Pareiasaurus, it was assigned to a new genus Provelosaurus by Lee (1997), who noted it shows more affinities with the small, highly derived, South African dwarf pareiasaurs (called Pumiliopareiasauria by Jalil & Janvier 2005 ) than with the more typical Pareiasaurus. According to Lee, Provelosaurus bridges the morphological gap between the advanced South African and the more generalized pareiasaurs. The African and Brazilian fauna is often very similar.
