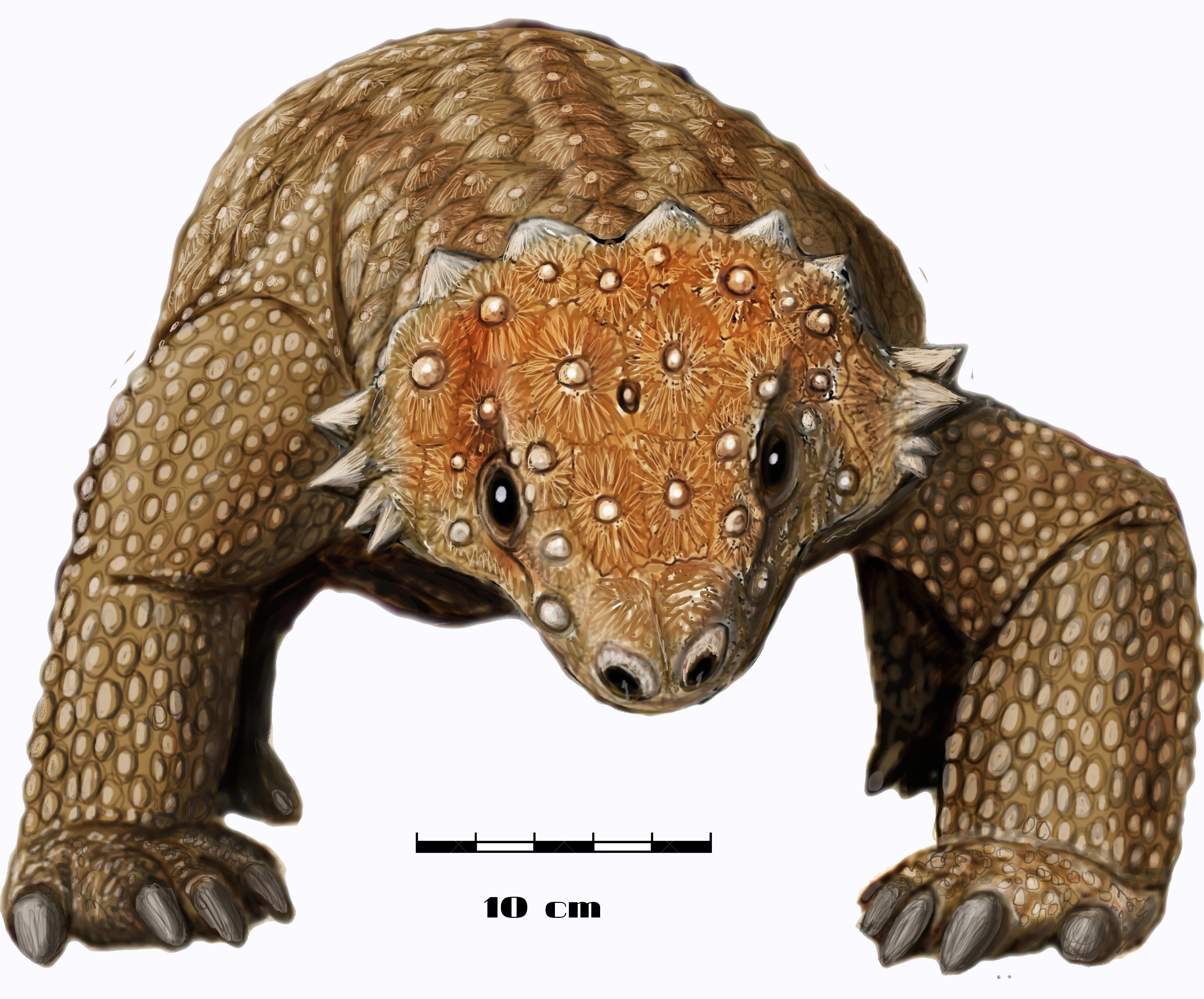
- Life reconstruction

Scientific classification
- Kingdom: Animalia
- Phylum: Chordata
- Class: Reptilia
- Clade: †Pareiasauria
- Clade: †Pumiliopareiasauria
- Genus: †Nanoparia; Broom, 1936

Type species
- †Nanoparia luckhoffi Broom, 1936

= Nanoparia =

Nanoparia Temporal range: Changhsingian, 254–252 Ma

Extinct genus of reptiles

Nanoparia is an extinct genus of pareiasaur known from the Permian of South Africa.

== Description ==
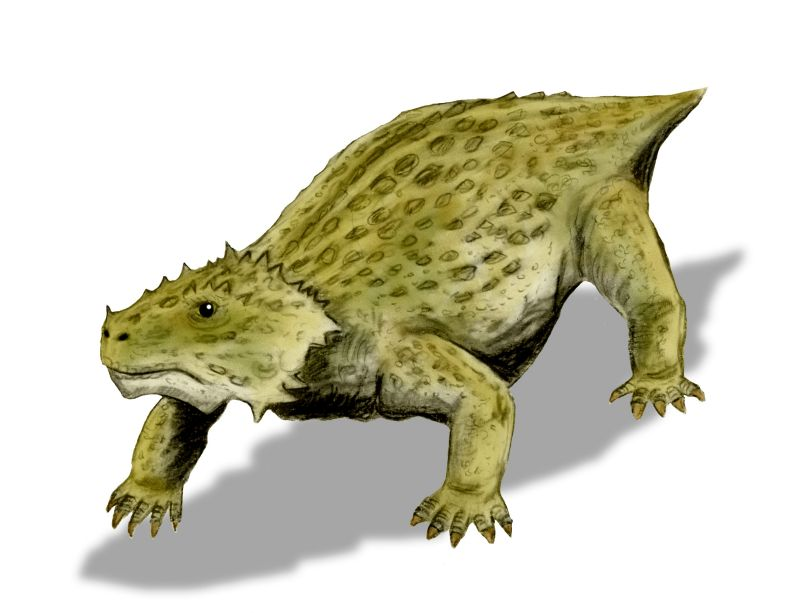
Restoration

It was about 60 cm (23.6 in) in length, and weighed around 8 to 10 kilograms (17.6-22 lbs).

== Classification ==
Nanoparia is an unusually small, spiny form. The skull is very similar to that of the Pareiasaurus, and Alfred Romer considered it a synonym of the latter. Yuri Orlov, however (in Osnovy Paleontology, the monumental multi-volume Russian textbook of Paleontology), placed it in the Elginiinae. Kuhn (1969) argued that, while resembling Elginia in the ossifications at the rear of the skull, it differs completely in proportions and does not seem to be related. Lee (1997) considered it a basal member of the dwarf pareiasaurs.
