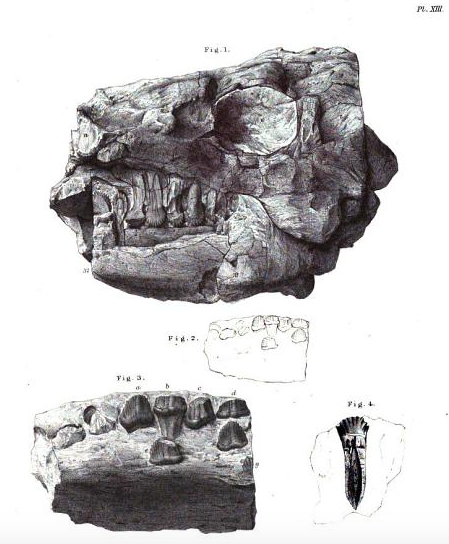
- Drawing of BMNH 47337 by Griesbach, 1876

Scientific classification
- Kingdom: Animalia
- Phylum: Chordata
- Class: Reptilia
- Clade: †Pareiasauria
- Clade: †Pumiliopareiasauria
- Genus: †Anthodon; Owen, 1876

Type species
- †Anthodon serrarius Owen, 1876

Other species
- †A. minisculus? Haughton, 1932

Synonyms
- Pareiasaurus parvus Haughton, 1913; Propappus parvus Haughton, 1913

= Anthodon (reptile) =

Anthodon Temporal range: Changhsingian, 254–252 Ma

Extinct genus of reptiles

Anthodon (from Ancient Greek ἄνθος (ánthos), meaning "flower", and ὀδούς (odoús), meaning "tooth") is an extinct genus of pareiasaur from the Permian period of South Africa and Tanzania.

== History ==
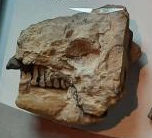
A cast of BMNH 47337 at the Oxford University Museum of Natural History, 2023

In 1845, amateur geologists William Guybon Atherstone and Andrew Geddes Bain discovered several fossils near Dassieklip, Cape Province, in the Bushman's River Valley. This was the first dinosaur find in Africa and in the Southern Hemisphere. In 1849 and 1853, Bain sent some of the fossils to palaeontologist Richard Owen for identification. Among them was an upper jaw Bain referred to as the "Cape Iguanodon", so the site was named "Iguanodonhoek". Atherstone published a short paper about the discovery in 1857, but lamented in 1871 that it had thus far received no attention in London. In 1876 Owen named a series of specimens from the collection Anthodon serrarius, basing the generic name on the resemblance of the teeth to a flower. The partial holotype skull BMNH 47337, the left jaw BMNH 47338, the matrix BMNH 47338 including bone fragments and impressions of the anterior skull, and the vertebrae BMNH 47337a were all assigned to Anthodon. In 1882, Othniel Charles Marsh assigned Anthodon to Stegosauridae based on BMNH 47338, and in 1890, Richard Lydekker found that although Anthodon was a pareiasaur, its teeth were similar to those of the Stegosauridae. Lydekker in 1890 also corrected a mistake of Owen, who had incorrectly summarised all the material as coming from a single locality, whereas there was separate material from two clearly distinct localities.

Richard Owen, who described Anthodon, thought it was a dinosaur because dinosaurian skull material from the Early Cretaceous had become associated with the Permian material. The dinosaur material was later separated out by Robert Broom in 1912 and was renamed as the stegosaurid Paranthodon by Franz Nopcsa in 1929.

A possible second species, A. minusculus, was named by Sidney Haughton in 1932 based on remains found in the Cistecephalus other zone of the Usili Formation in Tanzania. Later authors have suggested that A. minusculus may have been the same animal as A. serratus.

Pareiasaurus parvus (Haughton, 1913) and Propappus parvus (Haughton, 1913) were also synonymised with Anthodon serrarius. The holotype of both species was SAM 2351, a pelvis discovered near Dunedin, Western Cape, South Africa.

== Description ==
Anthodon combines the primitive feature of interpterygoid fenestrae with an advanced feature of turtle-like armor. It was about 1.2 to 1.5 meters (3.9 to 4.9 ft) in length, and weighed around 80 to 100 kg (180 to 220 lb). Small dermal ossicles covered the body, while the pattern of armor plates on the back reminiscent of a turtle shell. The tail was further shortened relative to less derived forms. Some other forms are characterized by having smooth skulls and armor on the dorsal midline.

=== Skull ===
The skull was small, and the cheekbones unornamented as in other pareiasaurs. The skull is 30 cm in length and quite lightly built. The cheekbones form very large quadratojugal "horns" that extend downwards to a great degree, but with a smooth unornamented surface. The mandible has ventral protrusions (further "horns"). The postparietals are fused and, along with the tabulars, located on the skull roof, as in more primitive diadectomorphs. There are 11 to 14 pairs of overlapping teeth, of small and uniform size, each with 8 to 15 cusps, giving them, as with all pareiasaurs, a leaf-like or flower like appearance, hence the generic name "flower tooth".
