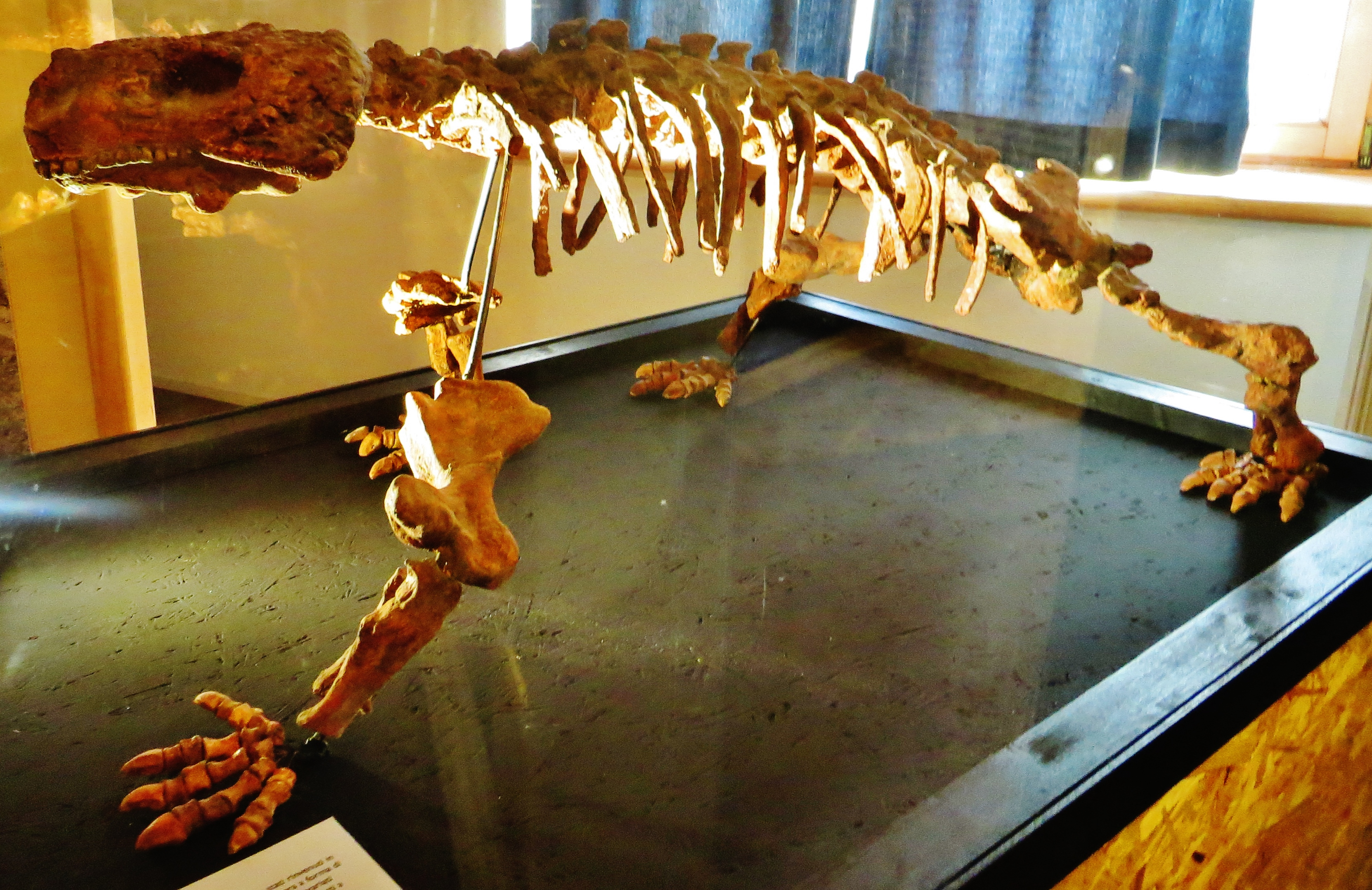
- Skeleton

Scientific classification
- Domain: Eukaryota
- Kingdom: Animalia
- Phylum: Chordata
- Clade: †Parareptilia
- Order: †Procolophonomorpha
- Clade: †Pareiasauria
- Family: †Pareiasauridae
- Genus: †Deltavjatia; Lebedev, 1987

Type species
- †Pareiasuchus vjatkensis Hartmann-Weinberg, 1937

Synonyms
- Anthodon rossicus Hartmann-Weinberg, 1937; Scutosaurus rossicus (Hartmann-Weinberg, 1937); Pareiasuchus vjatkensis Hartmann-Weinberg, 1937; Deltavjatia vjatkensis (Hartmann-Weinberg, 1937); Anthodon chlynoviensis Efremov, 1940

= Deltavjatia =

Deltavjatia Temporal range: Capitanian, 259–255 Ma

Extinct genus of reptiles

Deltavjatia is an extinct species of pareiasauromorph procolophonoid from the Tatarian stage of the Permian time period. It had a large body of about 1.5 m (4.9 ft) in length. Deltavjatia was an herbivore and lived in what is now Russia. The first specimen of Deltavjatia was a specimen of a skull and lower mandible (PIN 2212/1), found in the Urpalov Formation in Kotelnich, Vyatka River. Since then, numerous mostly complete skeletons have been found, many of them being so well preserved due to the silty, anaerobic environment of the Kotelnich deposits that fossilised white blood cells are able to be distinguished in them. Analyses of the bone histology of Deltavjatia show that they grew very rapidly during the early stages of their ontogeny but that their growth rate drastically slowed down once they reached approximately half of their full body size.

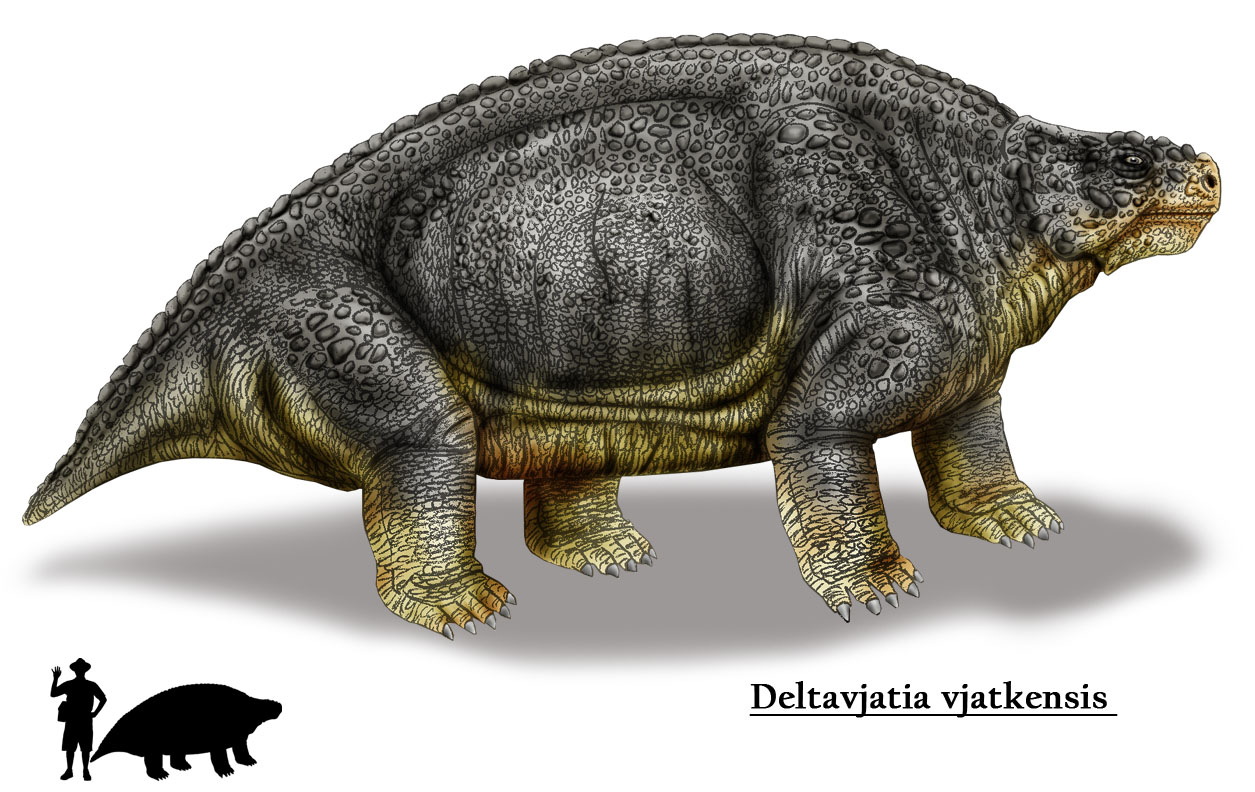
Restoration

Deltavjatia was placed as a subtaxon of Pareiasauridae by M.S.Y. Lee in 1997.

== See also ==
- Pareiasaur
- Procolophonia
- Kotelnich
- Vyatka (river)
- Russia
