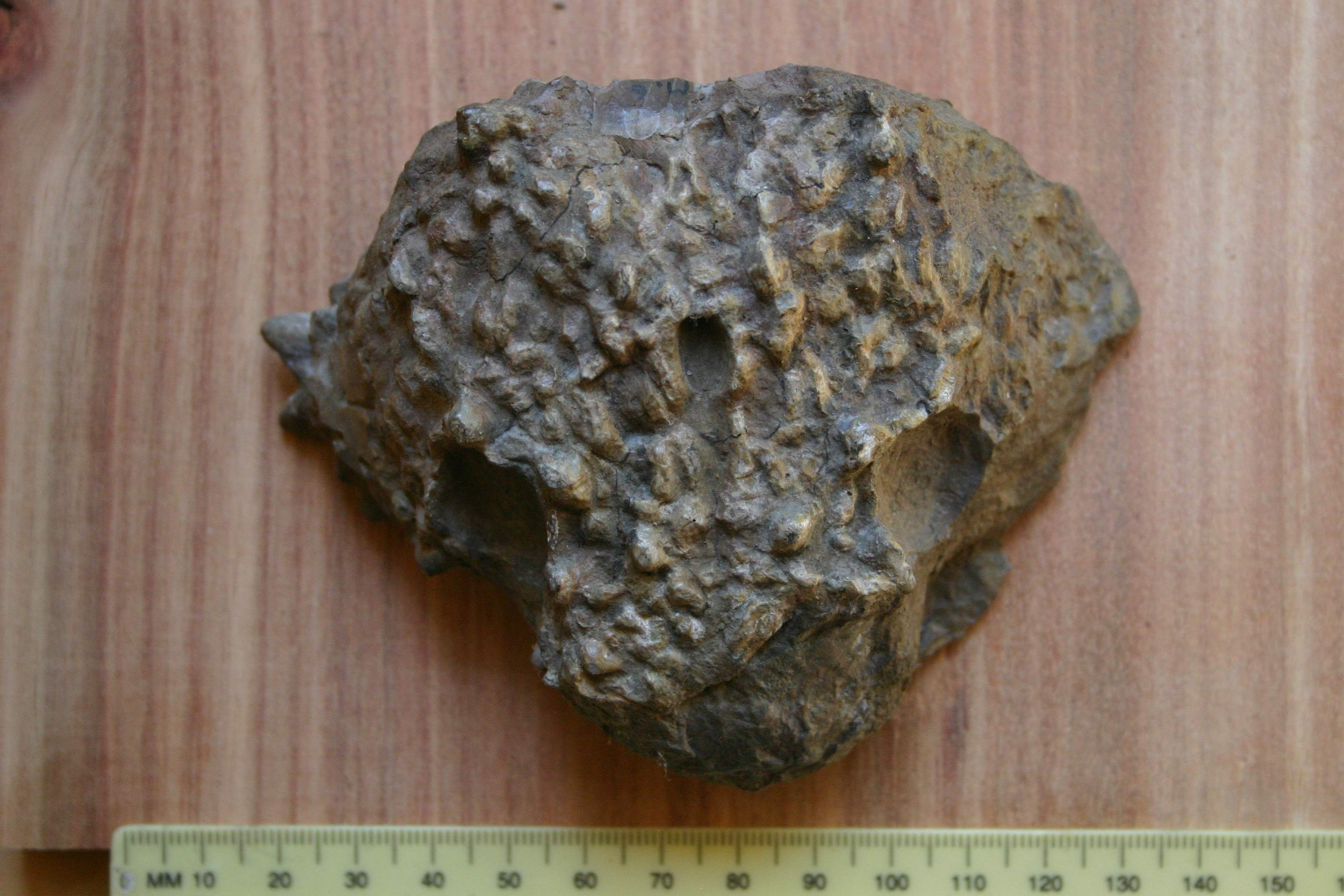
- Cast of distorted skull of juvenile P. serridens collected in February 1946 by James W. Kitching

Scientific classification
- Kingdom: Animalia
- Phylum: Chordata
- Class: Reptilia
- Clade: †Pareiasauria
- Genus: †Pareiasaurus; Owen, 1876

Type species
- †Pareiasaurus serridens Owen, 1876

Species
- †P. nasicornis Haughton and Boonstra, 1929; †P. peringueyi Haughton and Boonstra, 1929; †P. serridens Owen, 1876

Synonyms
- Anthodon gregoryi Broom, 1930; Anthodon nesemanni Broom, 1940; Brachypareia rogersi Broom, 1912; Bradysaurus rogersi Broom, 1912; Pareiasaurus minor Seeley, 1892; Pareiasaurus omocratus Seeley, 1888; Pareiasaurus pinnatus Olson & Broom, 1937; Pareiasaurus pulcher Broom, 1935; Pareiasaurus rubidgei Broom, 1940; Pareiasuchus nasicornis Haughton & Boonstra, 1929; Pareiasuchus peringueyi Broom & Haughton, 1913; Propappus omocratus Seeley, 1888; Propappus serridens Owen, 1876; Propappus rogersi Broom, 1912

= Pareiasaurus =

Pareiasaurus Temporal range: Wuchiapingian - Changhsingian, 260–252 Ma

Extinct genus of reptiles

Pareiasaurus (from Greek: pareia, "cheek" and Greek: sauros, "lizard") is an extinct genus of pareiasauromorph reptile from the Permian period. It was a typical member of its family, the pareiasaurids, which take their name from this genus.

Fossils have been found in the Beaufort Group.

== Description ==
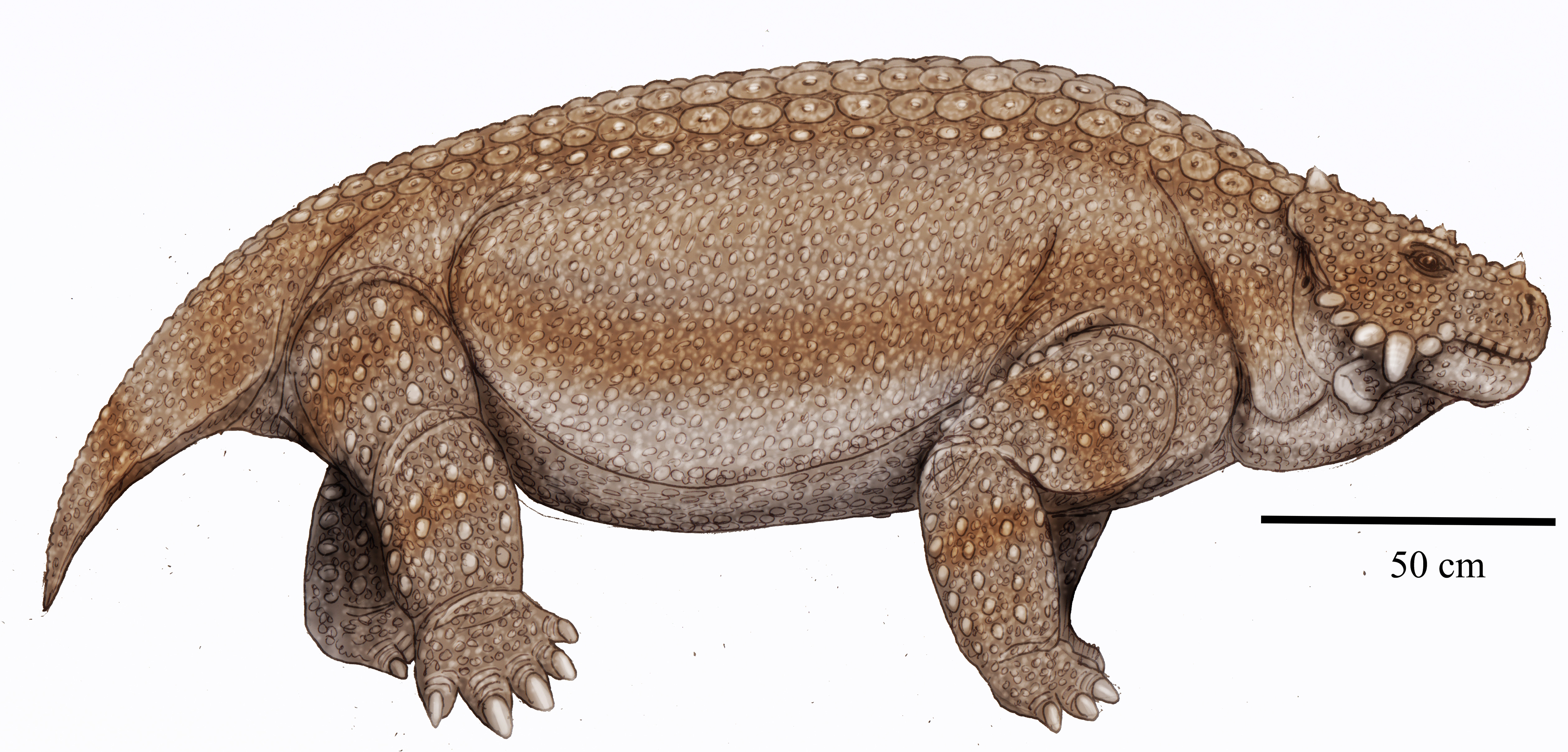
Life restoration of P. peringueyi

Pareiasaurus is a large quadruped, about 2.5 metres (8.2 ft) long, with elephantine legs, walking in a typically reptilian posture. The skull is broad and the snout short. Its skull had several spine- and wart-like protrusions. Pareiasaurus's leaf-shaped teeth, ideal for biting through tough plant fibers, indicate it was a herbivore. Even the palate had teeth.

== Species ==
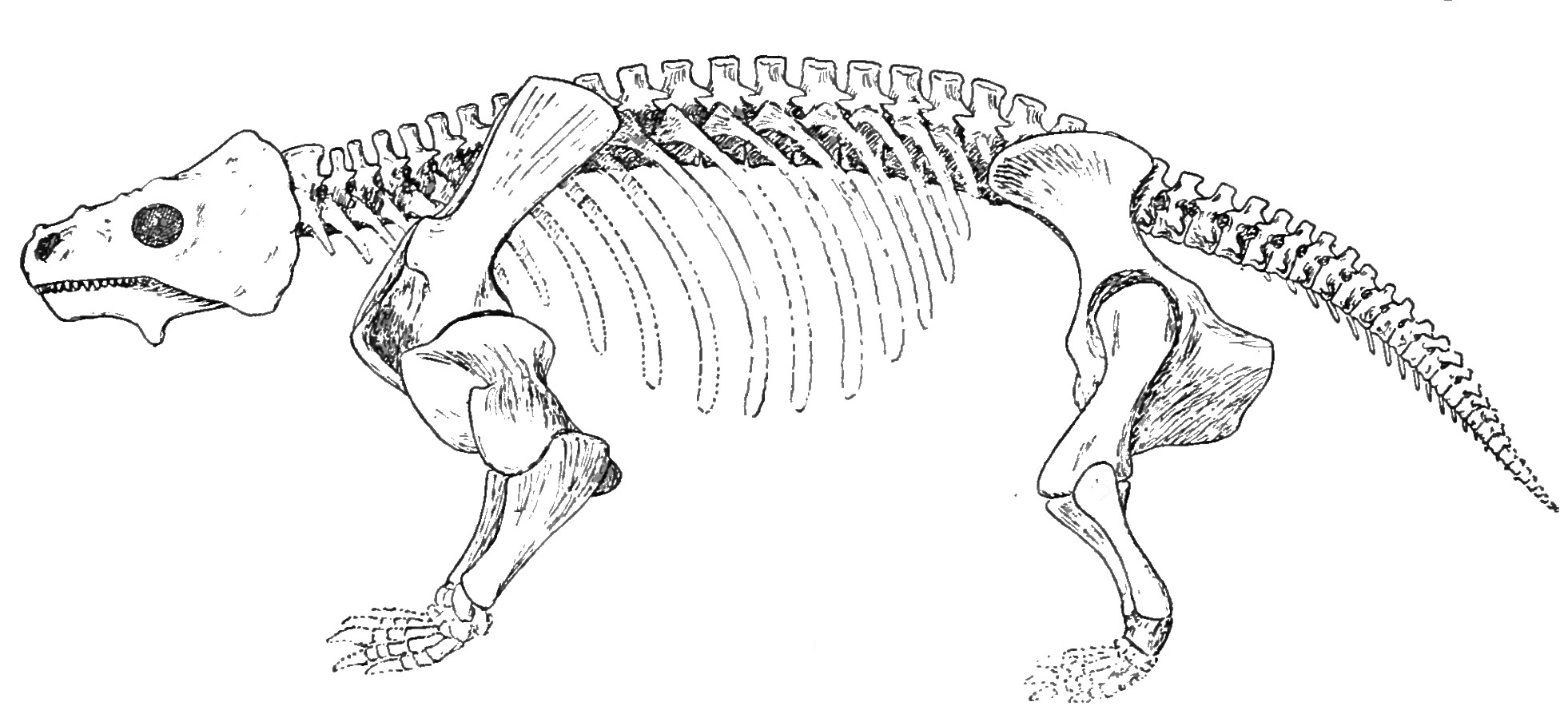
Skeleton of P. serridens

P. nasicornis (Haughton and Boonstra, 1929) is from the Tropidostoma Zone, Karoo basin, South Africa. This early form is one of the first representatives of the genus. It was originally included under the genus Pareiasuchus. The snout is heavily armoured, and bears a horn-like boss. The teeth are equipped with 11 (or possibly 13 or 15) cusps. This is a large animal; the skull is about 50 cm in length. This species might be ancestral to Pareiasaurus peringueyi.

P. peringueyi (Haughton and Boonstra, 1929) is from the Cistecephalus Zone, Karoo basin, South Africa. It is represented by a nearly complete skeleton from the Zak River, South Africa. It is a medium-sized animal, the skull being 36 cm long. It is distinguished especially by the large quadrato-jugal region inclined far outwards and forwards so that its lower border makes an angle of about 120° with the maxillary border; this cheek bears large bony bosses. There are at least 13 pairs of teeth in the upper jaw, each with 13 or possibly 15 cusps.

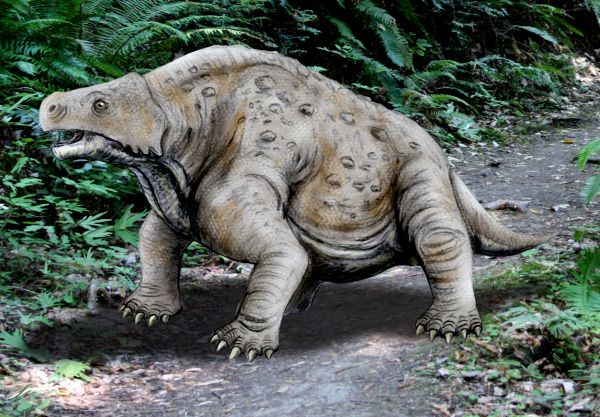
Restoration of P. serridens

P. serridens (Owen, 1876) is from the Dicynodon Zone, Karoo basin, South Africa. This species was the type species for Pareiasuchus. This late species is the type species for Pareiasaurus, and represents the culmination of this lineage. The armour is well developed. There are 14 pairs of teeth, each with 9 to 11 cusps. The short deep skull is about 40 cm in length. Note the extended quadrato-jugal region (cheek bones).
