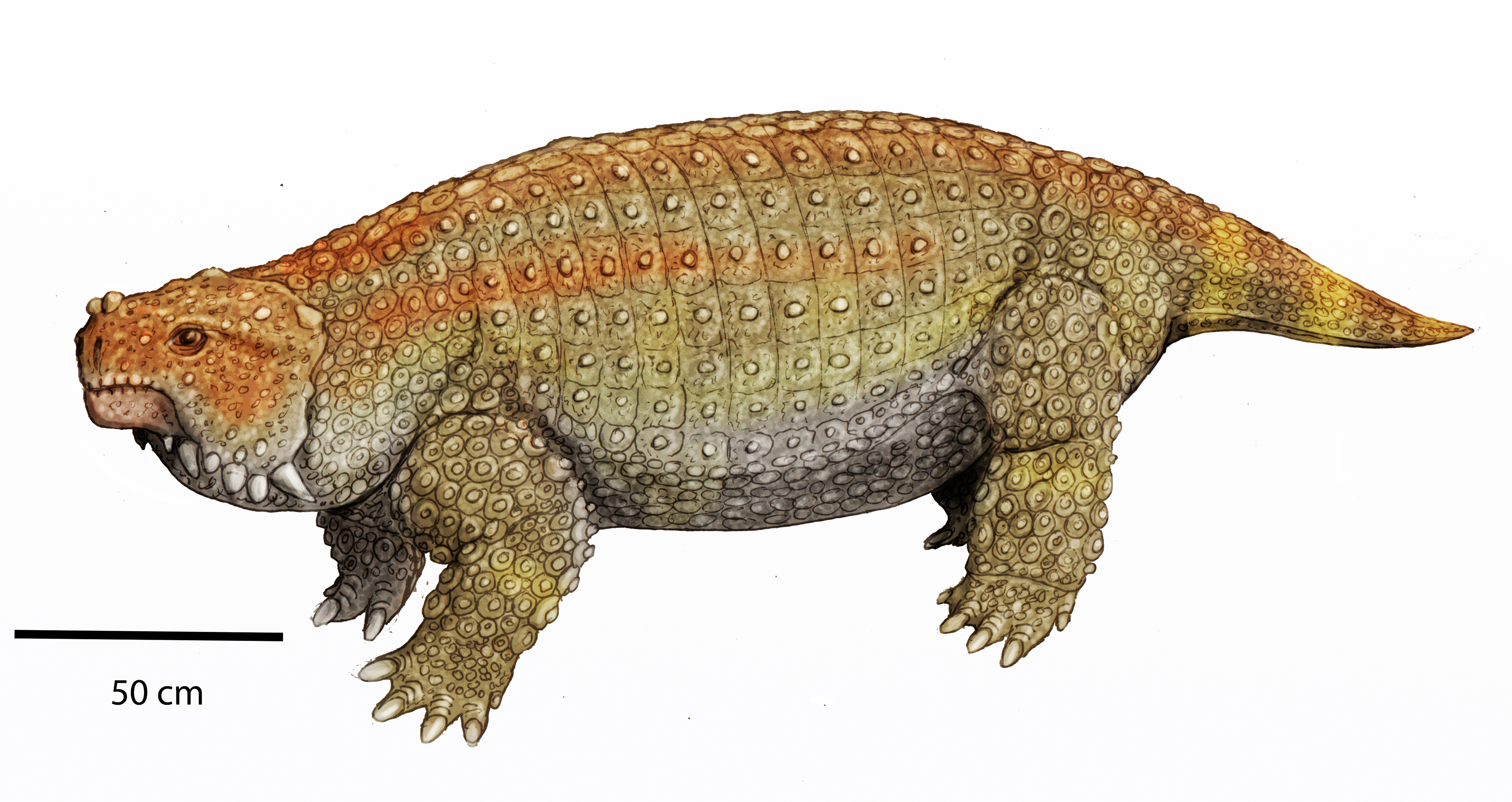
- Life restoration of Pareiasaurus serridens (Pareiasauria)
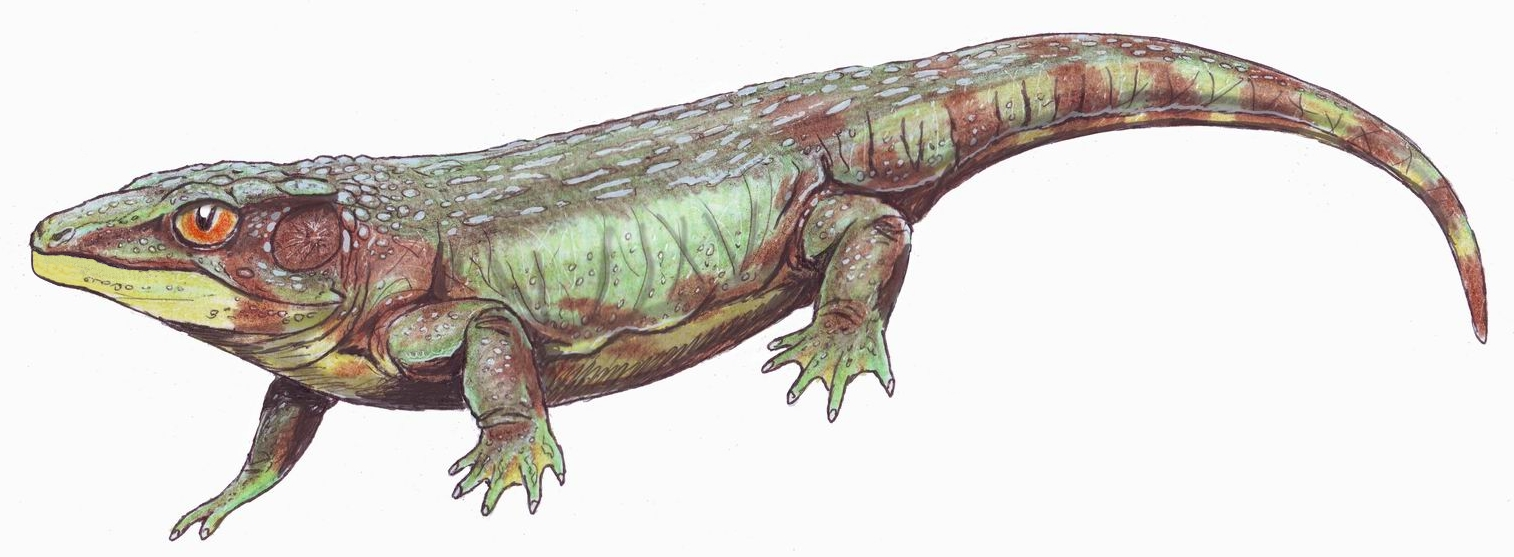
- Life restoration of Macroleter (Nycteroleteridae)

Scientific classification
- Kingdom: Animalia
- Phylum: Chordata
- Class: Reptilia
- Clade: †Ankyramorpha
- Suborder: †Procolophonia
- Clade: †Pareiasauromorpha; Tsuji, 2011

Subgroups
- Nycteroleteridae; Pareiasauria

= Pareiasauromorpha =

Pareiasauromorphs Temporal range: Middle to latest Permian, 265–252 Ma

Extinct clade of reptiles

Pareiasauromorpha is a clade of stem reptilies from the Permian. It includes genera found all over the world, with many genera from Asia and South Africa. The clade was first used as a group by Linda A. Tsuji in 2011 to group the family Nycteroleteridae (nycteroleters) and the superfamily Pareiasauroidea (pareiasaurs). Pareiasauromorpha is considered to be a monophyletic clade, the sister group to Procolophonoidea.

== Classification ==
Pareiasauromorpha was first used to define a group of stem reptiles in 2011 by Linda A. Tsuji. The next year, Tsuji and her colleagues used Pareiasauromorpha as a node inside Procolophonia. In their 2012 publication, Tsuji et al. defined it as a monophyletic node containing "nycteroleters" (the family Nycteroleteridae) and "pareiasaurs" (in the superfamily Pareiasauroidea).

=== Nycteroleteridae ===
Nycteroleteridae is a family, commonly called "nycteroleters", classified in Pareiasauromorpha. The group includes the genera Emeroleter, Nycteroleter, Bashkyroleter, Rhipaeosaurus, Macroleter, and "Bashkyroleter" mesensis. The genus Tokosaurus is often classified as the sister taxon to Macroleter, but is actually more likely a juvenile of the latter. Bashykroleter, including both species, is now considered paraphyletic, as "B." mesensis is more closely related to other genera than the type species B. bashkyricus.

=== Pareiasauroidea ===
Pareiasauroidea is a superfamily, called "pareiasaurs", that is classified as the sister group to "nycteroleters". It includes many genera and, in some classifications, is grouped with Macroleter as the most basal member, or the sister taxon, with Macroleter outside of Nycteroleteridae. Apart from the possible genus Macroleter, the species "Bradysaurus" seeleyi is often classified outside its genus as the most primitive species, with the genus also classified as basal.

=== Phylogeny ===
The cladogram below was found in 2011 by Tsuji, and modified in 2012 by Tsuji et al.:

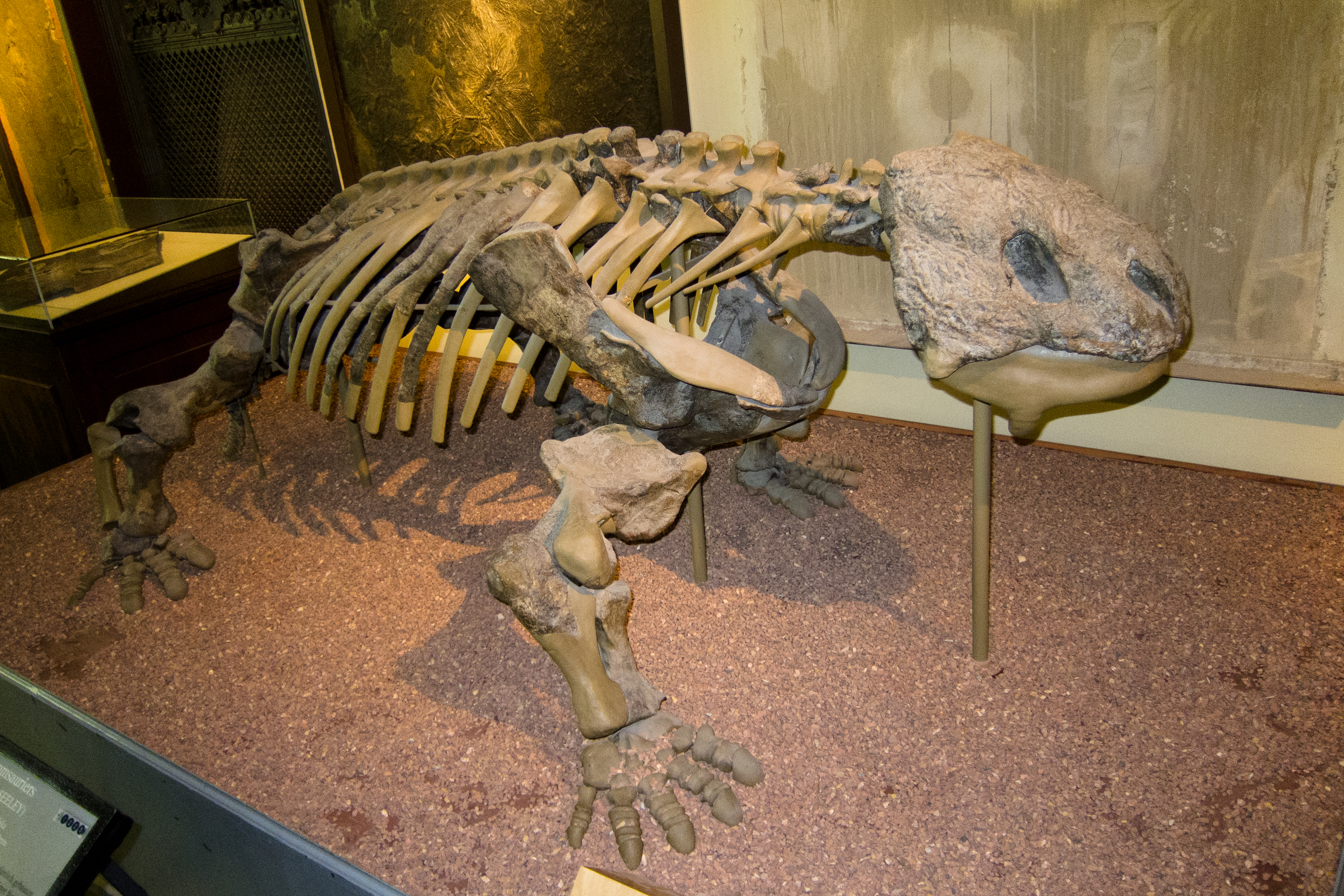
Mounted skeleton of Bradysaurus, also a pareiasaur, Berlin's Natural History Museum

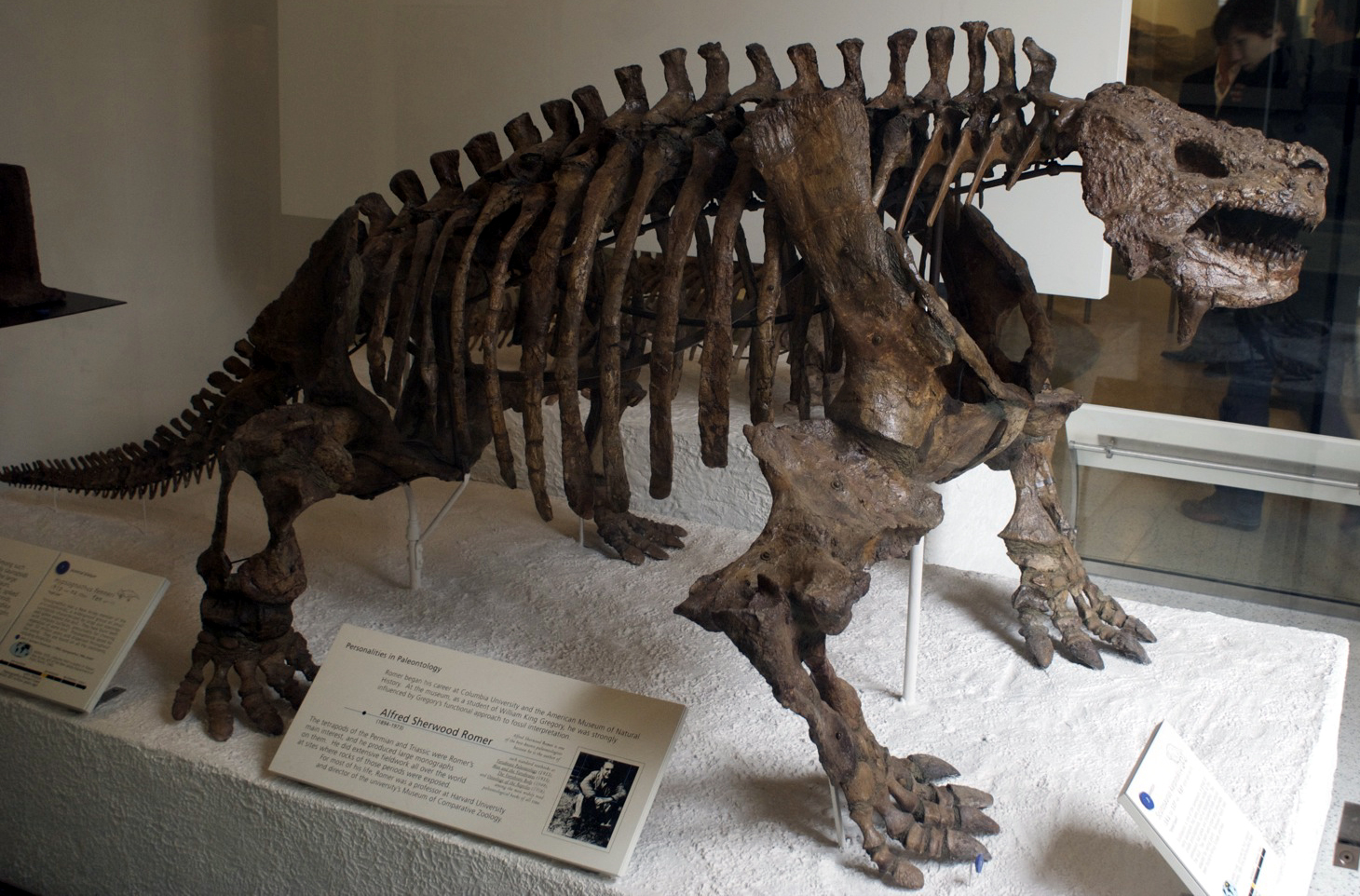
Skeleton of Scutosaurus, a well-known pareiasaur

- - Nyctiphruretus
  - Procolophonia
    - Procolophonidae
      - Procolophon
      - - Barasaurus
        - Owenetta
    - Pareiasauromorpha
      - Nycteroleteridae
        - Macroleter
        - - Bashkyroleter
          - Rhipaeosaurus
          - Emeroleter
          - Nycteroleter
          - "Bashkyroleter" mesensis
      - Pareiasauroidea
        - Bradysaurus
        - Velosauria
          - Scutosaurus
          - Pareiasaurus

A later study of 'parareptile' relationships published by Cisneros et al. (2021) recovered a diphyletic Lanthanosuchoidea, with Lanthanosuchus nested within Pareiasauromorpha:

- - Acleistorhinidae
  - Procolophonia
    - - Nyctiphruretidae
        - Nyctiphruretus
        - Abyssomedon
      - Procolophonoidea
        - Procolophon
        - - Barasaurus
          - "Owenetta" kitchingorum
    - Pareiasauromorpha
      - - Lanthanosuchus
        - Nycteroleteridae
          - Macroleter
          - - Bashkyroleter
            - Rhipaeosaurus
            - Emeroleter
            - Nycteroleter
            - "Bashkyroleter" mesensis
      - Pareiasauria
        - Bradysaurus
        - - Scutosaurus
          - Pareiasaurus

== Distribution ==
Pareiasauromorphs are known from across the globe, with large numbers of genera from the Karoo Basin of South Africa, and Asia. Among pareiasaurs, the genera Pareiasaurus, Anthodon, Bradysaurus, Pareiasuchus, Embrithosaurus, Nochelesaurus, Nanoparia, Pumiliopareia and "The Welgevonden Pareiasaur" are known from the Karoo Basin; Scutosaurus, Obirkovia and Deltavjatia are from Russia; Shihtienfenia, Sanchuansaurus and Shansisaurus are from China; Parasaurus is known from Germany; Bunostegos is known from Niger; Arganaceras is from Morocco; Provelosaurus is known from Brazil; and Elginia is from Scotland. Though pareiasaurs are widely distributed, all six known nycteroleters are currently only known from Russia. The group ranges in age from the earliest Guadalupian (271 million years ago) until the latest Lopingian (about 251 million years ago).
