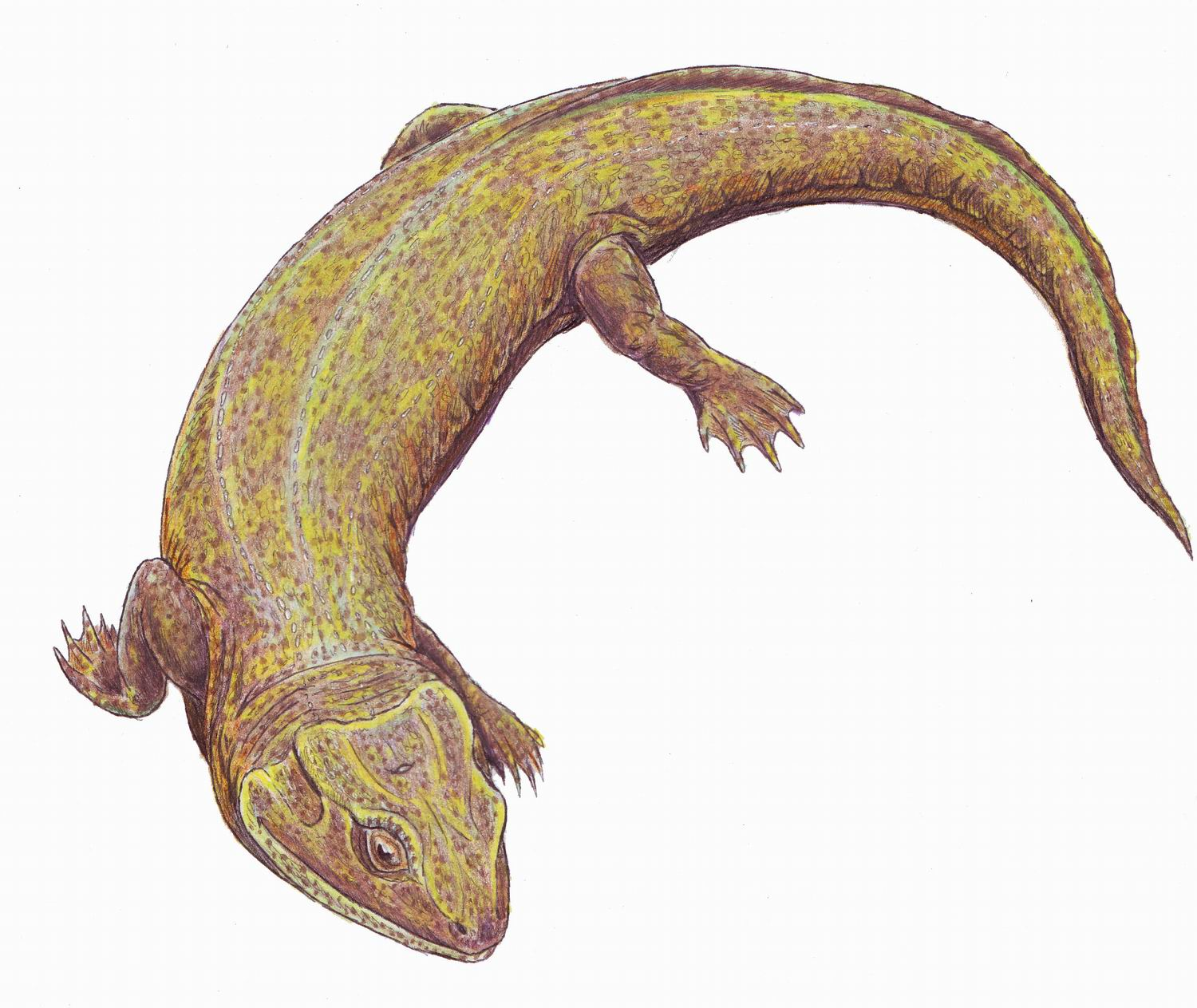
- Nycteroleter

Scientific classification
- Domain: Eukaryota
- Kingdom: Animalia
- Phylum: Chordata
- Clade: †Parareptilia
- Order: †Procolophonomorpha
- Family: †Nycteroleteridae
- Subfamily: †Nycteroleterinae; Romer, 1956

Genera
- †Emeroleter; †Nycteroleter

= Nycteroleterinae =

Nycteroleterinae Temporal range: Middle Permian

Extinct subfamily of reptiles

Nycteroleterinae is a subfamily of procolophonian parareptiles from the Middle Permian of Asia and North America.
