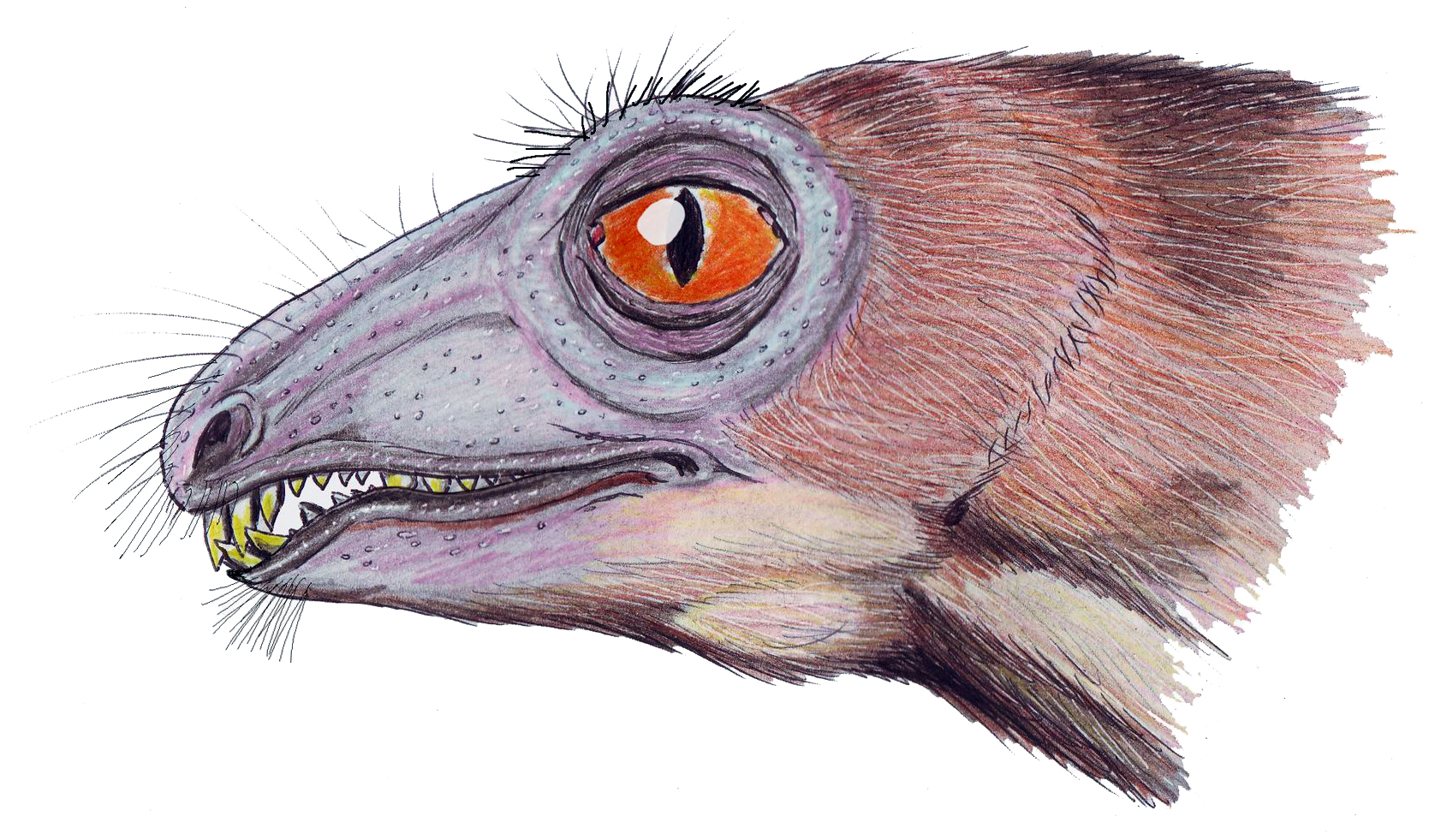

Scientific classification
- Kingdom: Animalia
- Phylum: Chordata
- Clade: Synapsida
- Clade: Therapsida
- Genus: †Niaftasuchus; Ivakhnenko, 1990
- Species: †N. zekkeli

Binomial name
- †Niaftasuchus zekkeli Ivakhnenko, 1990

= Niaftasuchus =

Niaftasuchus Temporal range: Guadalupian

Extinct genus of therapsids

Niaftasuchus is an extinct genus of therapsids. Its type and only named species is Niaftasuchus zekkeli.

Niaftasuchus had distinctive dentition. It has been interpreted as one of the earliest known herbivorous therapsids. It lived during the Guadalupian epoch of the Permian in what is now Russia, and inhabited an environment alongside some of the last non-therapsid synapsids, such as the caseasaur Ennatosaurus and the varanopid Mesenosaurus.

Niaftasuchus is one of several enigmatic early therapsids from Russia that may be based on juvenile material. Its phylogenetic affinities are controversial; it has been classified as a biarmosuchian, dinocephalian, or anomodont, and it has also been suggested to belong to a lineage of its own.

== Description ==
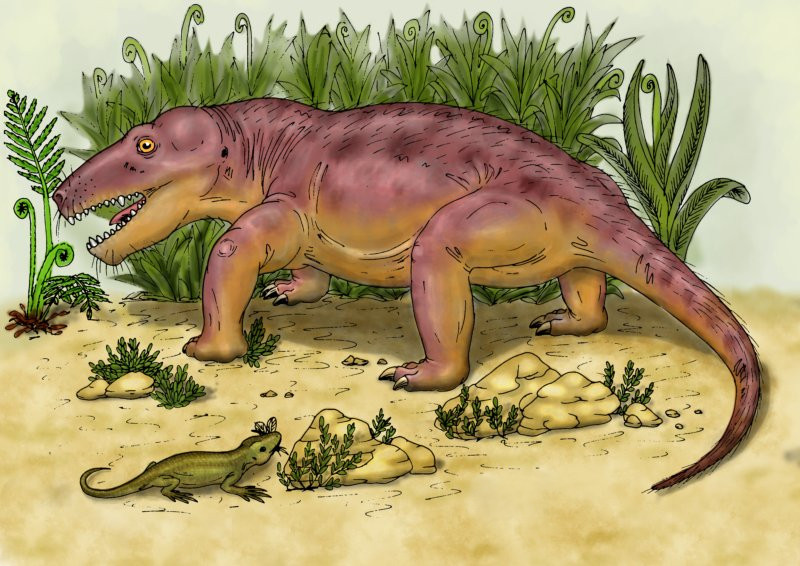
Restoration

Niaftasuchus has a distinctive dentition composed of large, procumbent, leaf-shaped teeth. There are three pairs of incisors, but the canines are not particularly distinct from the other maxillary teeth. There are a few palatal teeth. Like biarmosuchians, Niaftasuchus has exceptionally large eye sockets, though this may be a juvenile character. The skull is low and broad.

The known specimens of Niaftasuchus are very small; the holotype skull is only 9 centimetres (3.5 in) long. It has been interpreted as being based on probable juvenile material.

== History of study ==
The holotype specimen of Niaftasuchus zekkeli, an incomplete skull without the mandible, was collected near the Pyoza river in Arkhangelsk Oblast, Russia, near Nyafta (Russian: Няфта). It was named in 1990 by M. F. Ivakhnenko, with the name referring to the place where it was found and honoring the geologist I. D. Zekkel. Ivakhnenko initially interpreted it as a tapinocephalian, but subsequently proposed a monotypic order, Niaftasuchida, for it. In 2000, Battail and Surkov argued it was a biarmosuchian. In 2001, Ivakhnenko suggested it was an anomodont, but in 2003 returned to regarding it as a dinocephalian on the basis of new material.

== Classification ==
The classification of Niaftasuchus is considered problematic. It is assigned to a family of its own, Niaftasuchidae. Ivakhnenko, who first described Niaftasuchus, regards it as a basal dinocephalian, whereas Battail and Surkov classified Niaftasuchus in Biarmosuchia. It is also possible that it belongs to neither lineage, and forms a distinctive therapsid group of its own.

There is only one named species, Niaftasuchus zekkeli, but a specimen that may represent a second species is known. It differs from the type species in having a straight tooth row without enlarged maxillary teeth.

== Paleobiology ==
Niaftasuchus is interpreted as an herbivore, with its teeth adapted primarily for tearing off soft plant parts. Based on possible coprolites found in the mouth of a juvenile specimen, Ivakhnenko suggested that juvenile Niaftasuchus would ingest coprolites to develop their gut microbiota, as in many modern herbivores.

== See also ==
- List of therapsids

== Bibliography ==
- Battail, Bernard; Surkov, Mikhail V. (2000). "Mammal-like reptiles from Russia". In Benton, Michael J.; Shishkin, Mikhail A.; Unwin, David M.; Kurochkin, Evgenii N. (eds.). The Age of Dinosaurs in Russia and Mongolia. Cambridge University Press. pp. 86–119. ISBN 9780521545822.
- Ivakhnenko, M. F. (1990). "Позднепалеозойский фаунистический комплекс тетрапод из отложени бассейна р. мезень". Paleontologicheskii Zhurnal (in Russian) (4): 81–90.
- Ivakhnenko, M. F. (2003). "Eotherapsids from the East European placket". Paleontological Journal. 37 (S4): 339–465.
- Ivakhnenko, M. F. (2008). "Cranial morphology and evolution of Permian Dinomorpha (Eotherapsida) of eastern Europe". Paleontological Journal. 42 (9): 859–995. doi:10.1134/S0031030108090013. eISSN 1555-6174. ISSN 0031-0301. S2CID 85114195.
- Ivakhnenko, M. F.; Golubev, V. K.; Gubin, Yu. M.; Kalandadze, N. N.; Novikov, I. V.; Sennikov, A. G.; Rautian, A. S. (1997). Permian and Triassic tetrapods of Eastern Europe. Moscow: GEOS. ISBN 5-89118-029-4.
- Kammerer, Christian F. (2011). "Systematics of the Anteosauria (Therapsida: Dinocephalia)". Journal of Systematic Palaeontology. 9 (2): 261–304. doi:10.1080/14772019.2010.492645. ISSN 1477-2019. S2CID 84799772.
- Kemp, T. S. (2005). The origin and evolution of mammals. Oxford biology. Oxford; New York: Oxford University Press. ISBN 978-0-19-850760-4.
