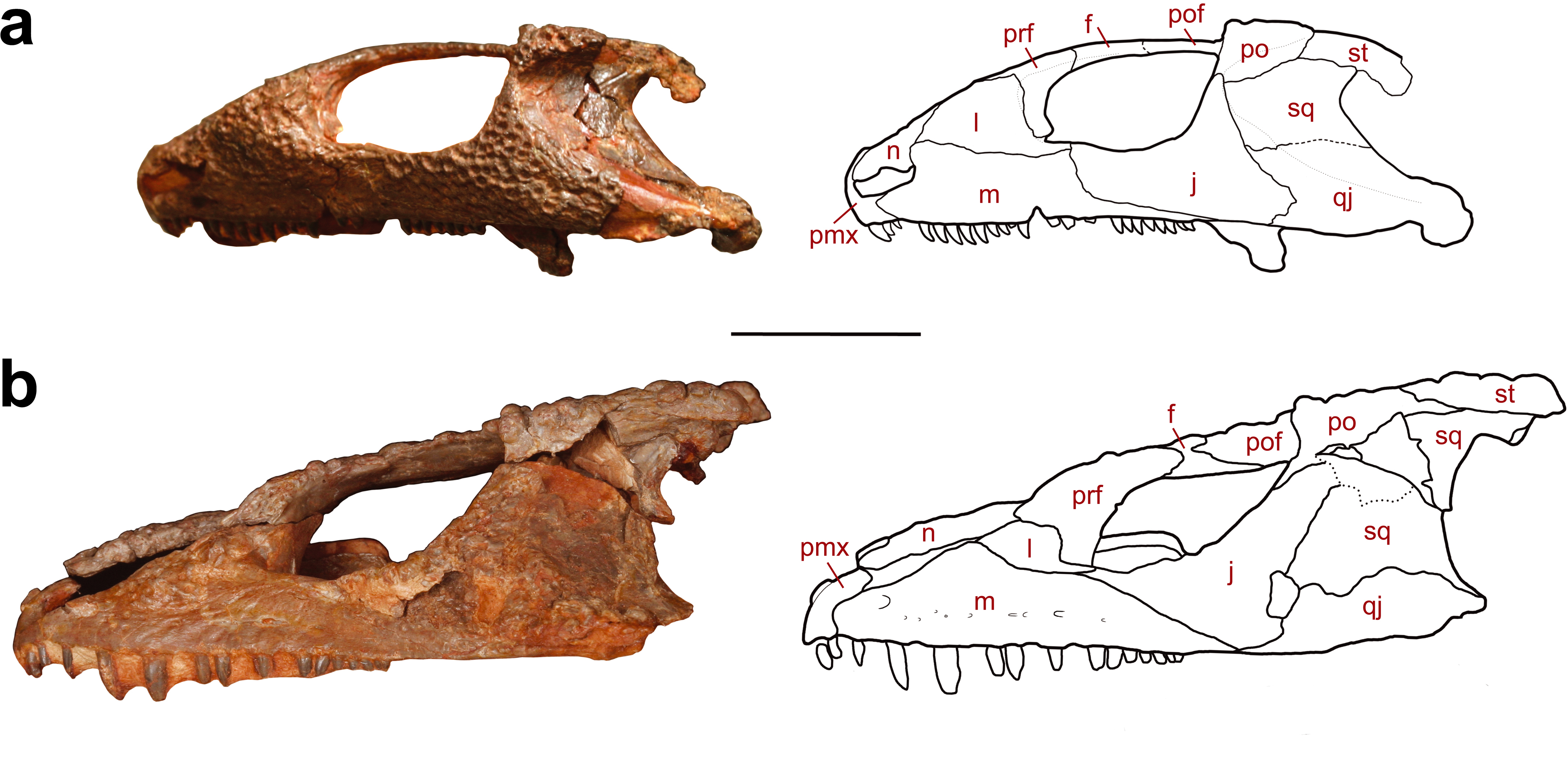
- Skull photo and diagram of Bashkyroleter mesensis and Macroleter poezicus

Scientific classification
- Domain: Eukaryota
- Kingdom: Animalia
- Phylum: Chordata
- Clade: †Parareptilia
- Order: †Procolophonomorpha
- Family: †Nycteroleteridae
- Genus: †Bashkyroleter; Ivakhnenko, 1997

Type species
- †Bashkyroleter bashkyricus (Efremov, 1940)

Species
- B. bashkyricus (Efremov, 1940); "B." mesensis Ivakhnenko, 1997

Synonyms
- Nycteroleter bashkyricus Ivakhnenko, 1997

= Bashkyroleter =

Bashkyroleter Temporal range: Middle Permian, Guadalupian

Extinct genus of reptiles

Bashkyroleter is an extinct genus of nycteroleterid parareptile which existed in European Russia during the middle Permian period.

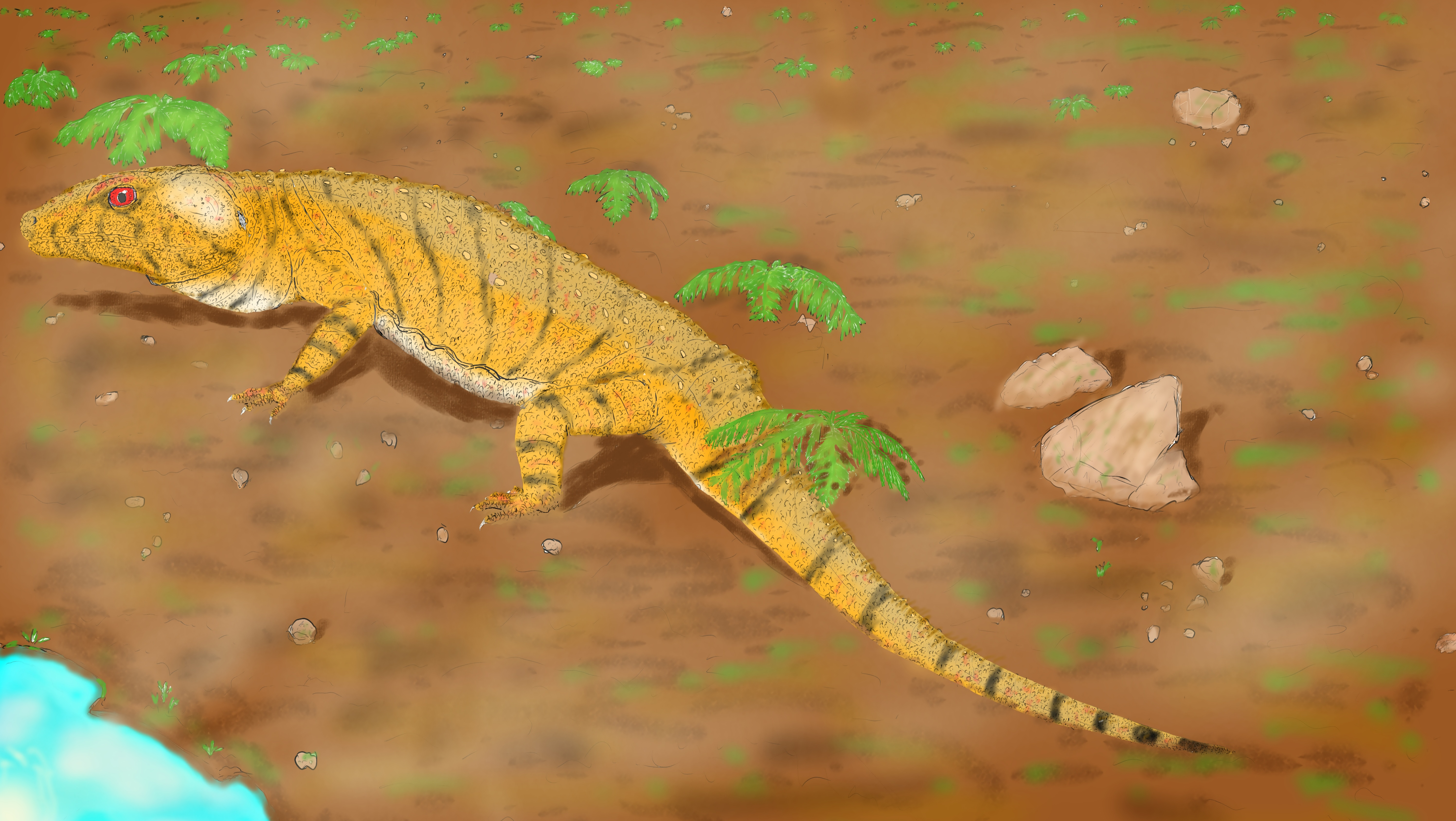
Reconstruction of Bashkyroleter mesensis
