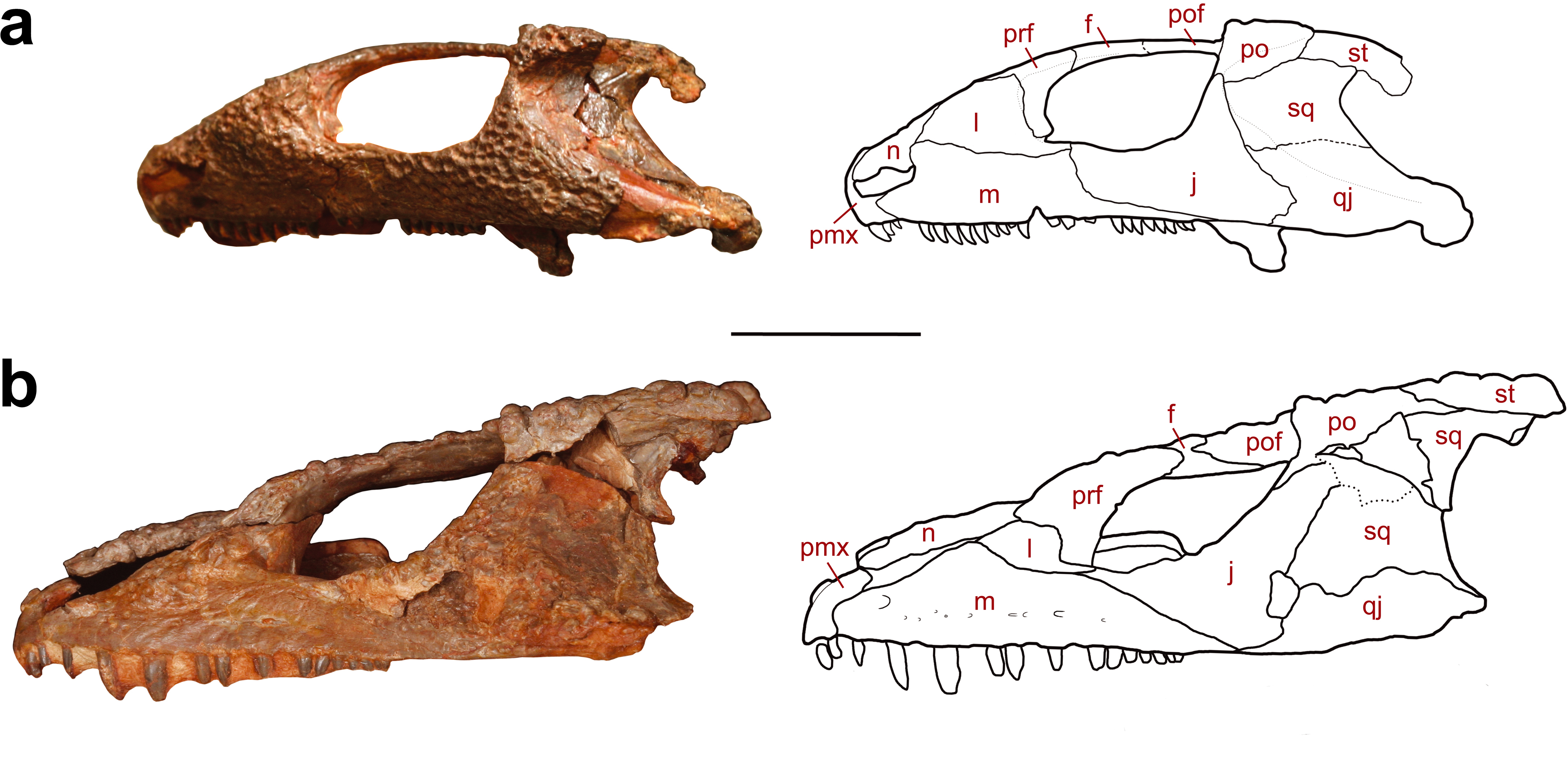
- Adult and juvenile skulls of Macroleter (=Tokosaurus)
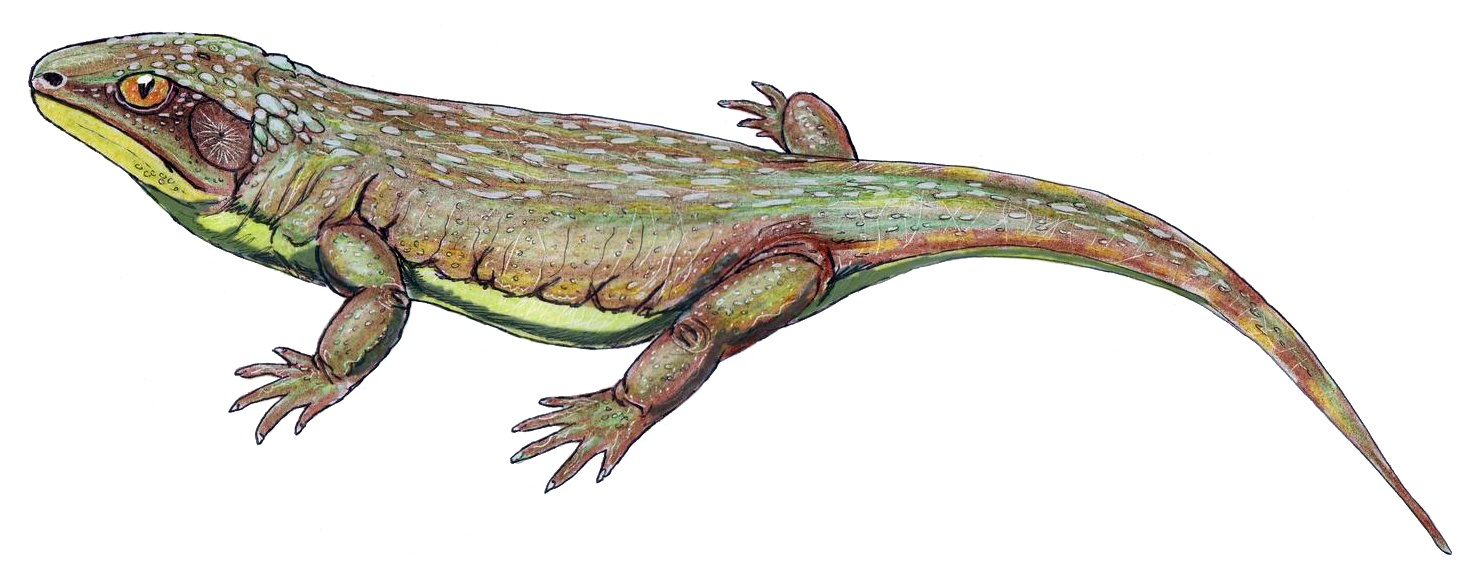
- Life restoration of Emeroleter

Scientific classification
- Kingdom: Animalia
- Phylum: Chordata
- Class: Reptilia
- Clade: †Pareiasauromorpha
- Family: †Nycteroleteridae; Romer, 1956

Genera
- See text

= Nycteroleteridae =

Nycteroleterids Temporal range: Middle Permian, 264–259.1 Ma

Extinct family of reptiles

Nycteroleteridae is a proposed family of procolophonian stem reptiles from the Middle to Late Permian of Russia and possibly North America. They are sometimes classified as a sister group to pareiasaurids, but may also form a grade at the base of this group. The group includes the genera Macroleter, Bashkyroleter, "Bashkyroleter" mesensis, Nycteroleter, Emeroleter, and probably Rhipaeosaurus. They were likely faunivorous or insectivorous. The group was most common in European Russia, with only a few fossils in North America possibly referred to the clade. One fossil has also been found in Africa, but this is the only one from Gondwana.

== Classification ==
Nycteroleteridae is sometimes considered a sister group to the Pareiasauridae, but Bayesian inference suggests that it was in fact paraphyletic, with Rhipaeosaurus a basal member of the Pareiasauridae and other members of the Nycteroleteridae as outgroups. This is supported by the appearance of Rhipaeosaurus' skull and teeth - it had tricuspid teeth and multiple horns on the skull, resembling a pareiasaur but smaller and with a longer tail. For this reason it is often seen as intermediate between more primitive nycteroleterids and more advanced pareiasaurids such as Scutosaurus.

== Subdivisions ==
- Subfamily † Nycteroleterinae
  - †Nycteroleter
  - †Emeroleter
- Unassigned subfamily
  - †Bashkyroleter
    - † Bashykroleter mesensis
  - †Macroleter
  - †Rhipaeosaurus

== Features ==
As discussed above, Nycteroleteridae technically includes all pareiasaurs as well as the five given genera. Within the five genera mentioned, there seems to be a smooth gradient of form from Macroleter to Rhipaeosaurus. Where Macroleter has no horns, Emeroleter has a few small horns, and Rhipaeosaurus' horns are quite large.

However, there are some characteristic features of the Nycteroleteridae. They have a deeply incised otic notch (similar to most other procolophonians), regular circular pits in the skull, and a row of palatal teeth from the interpterygoid vacuity to the edge of the choana.

Examination of the nycteroleterids' middle ear bones and comparison with living amniotes showed that they probably had efficient impedance-matching hearing. They are thought to have been carnivorous or insectivorous, but Rhipaeosaurus may have been an omnivore.
