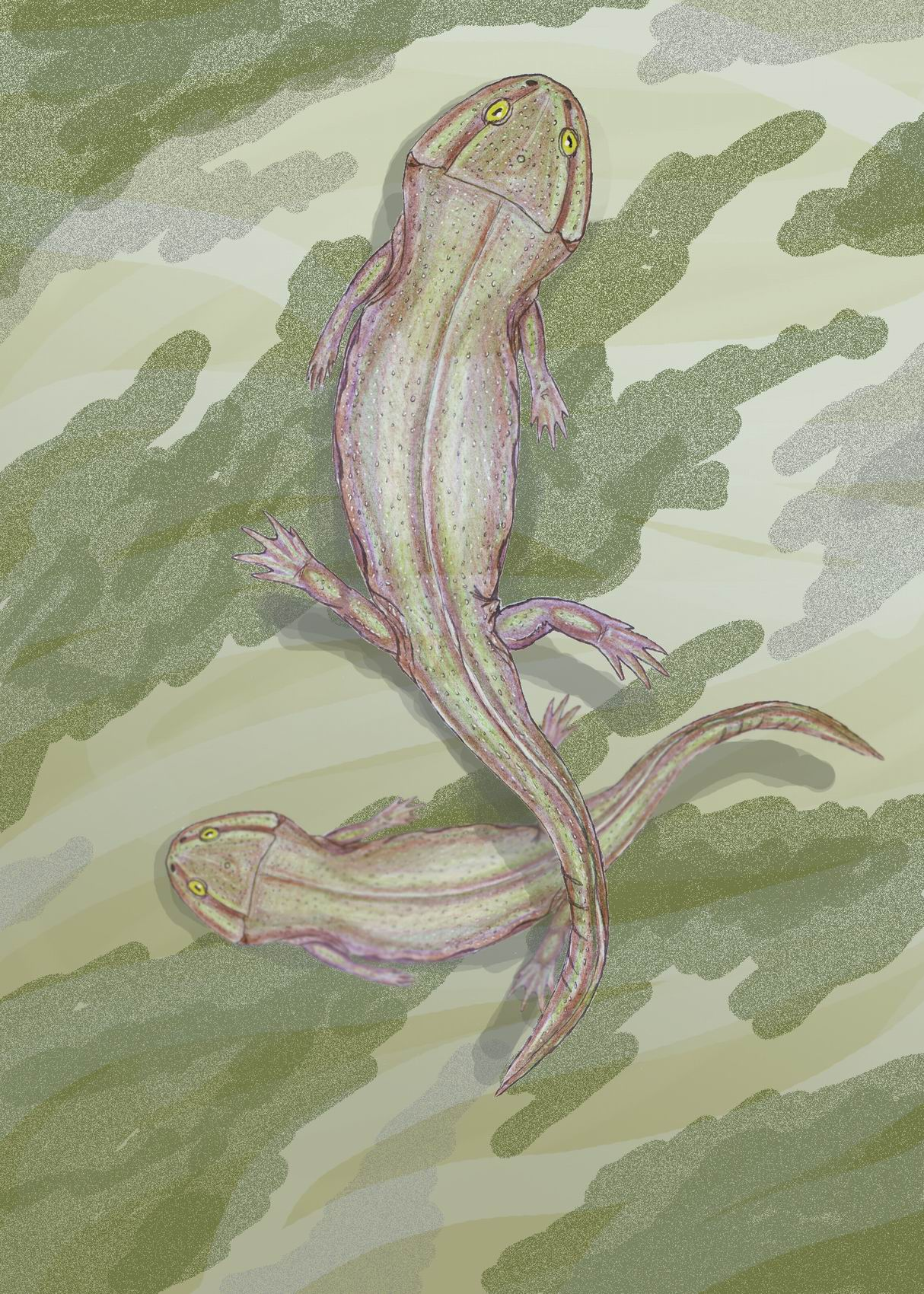
- Restoration of Leptoropha talonorophus

Scientific classification
- Domain: Eukaryota
- Kingdom: Animalia
- Phylum: Chordata
- Order: †Seymouriamorpha
- Family: †Kotlassiidae
- Subfamily: †Leptorophinae
- Genus: †Leptoropha; Chudinov, 1955

Type species
- †Leptoropha novojilovi Chudinov, 1955

Species
- L. novojilovi Chudinov, 1955 (type); L. talonorophus (Chudinov, 1955 [originally Rhipaeosaurus]) Reisz & Laurin, 2001

Synonyms
- Rhipaeosaurus talonorophus (Chudinov, 1955)

= Leptoropha =

Leptoropha Temporal range: Middle Permian, Guadalupian

Extinct genus of tetrapodomorphs

Leptoropha is an extinct genus of aquatic seymouriamorph known from the Middle Permian of Russia.
