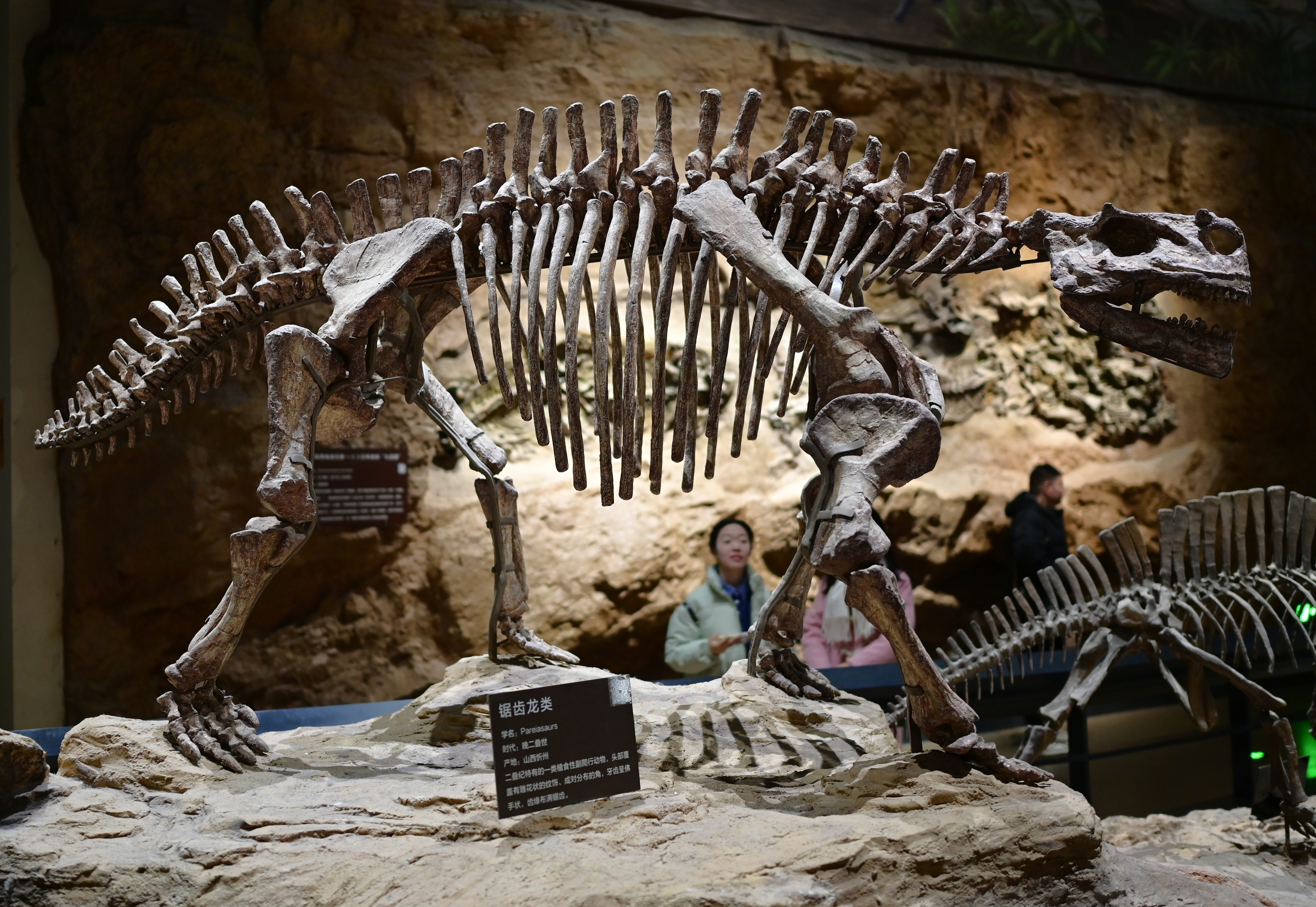
- Skeletal mount of S. completus, Baoding Natural History Museum

Scientific classification
- Kingdom: Animalia
- Phylum: Chordata
- Class: Reptilia
- Clade: †Pareiasauria
- Family: †Pareiasauridae
- Genus: †Shihtienfenia; Young & Yeh, 1963

Type species
- †Shihtienfenia permica Young & Yeh, 1963

Species
- †S. permica Young & Yeh, 1963; †S. completus Wang, Yi and Liu, 2019

Synonyms
- Huanghesaurus liuliensis Gao, 1983; Shansisaurus xuecunensis Cheng 1980

= Shihtienfenia =

Shihtienfenia Temporal range: Changhsingian, 254.0–252.3 Ma

Extinct genus of reptiles

Shihtienfenia is an extinct genus of pareiasaurid stem-reptile from the Late Permian of China.

== Species ==
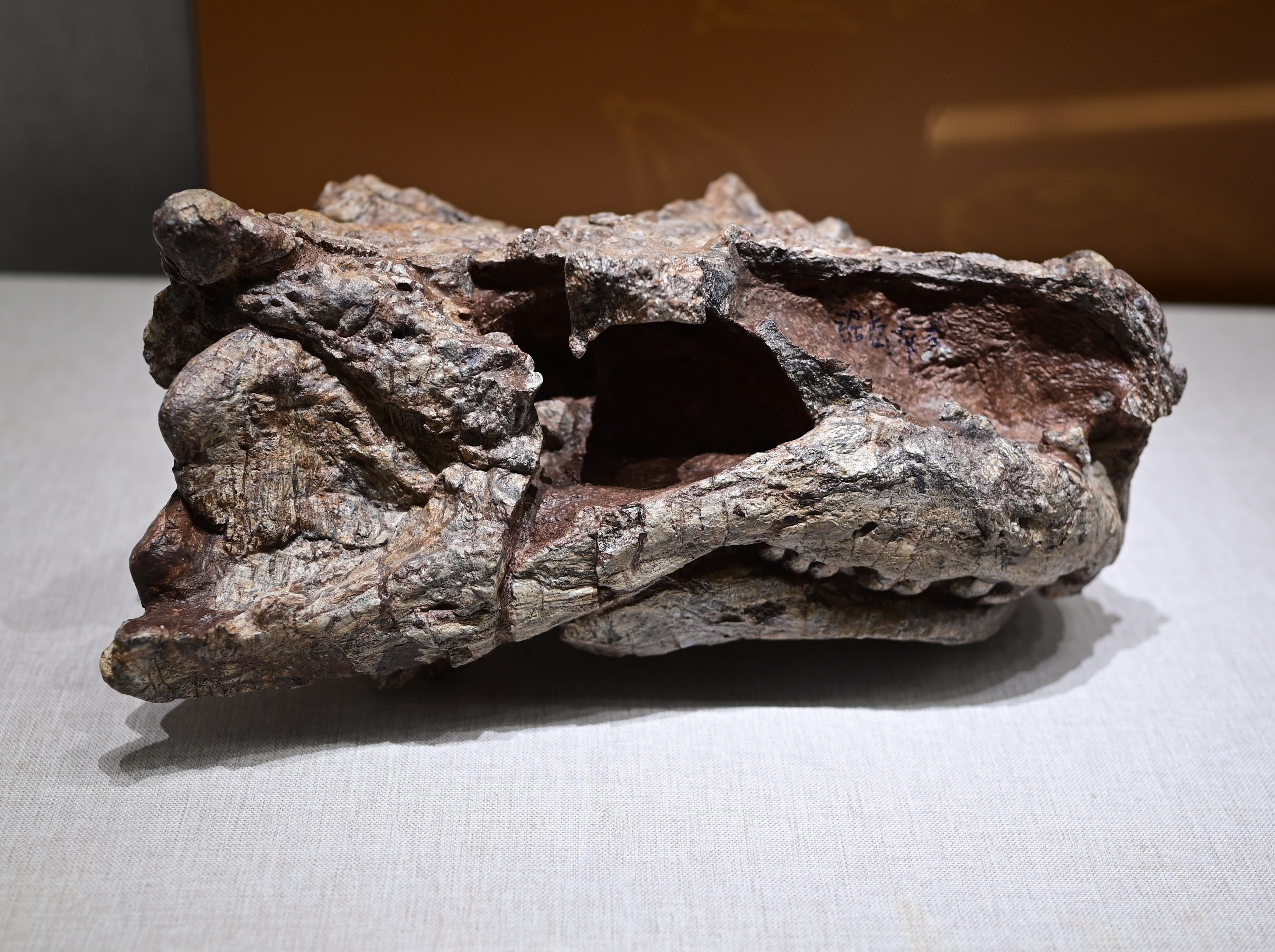
Holotype skull (IMMNH-PV0020) of S. completus, Baoding Natural History Museum

Lee (1997) refers to S. xuecunensis as a metaspecies lacking the autapomorphies of Shihtienfenia. Tsuji & Müller (2009) seem to consider it a valid taxon for cladistic analysis, and like Lee 1997 place the two Chinese species close to Pareiasuchus.

S. permica (Young and Yeh, 1963); The skull of this pareiasaur is unknown. It is known originally from a number of isolated vertebrae, jaws, and limb-bones and an incomplete skeleton, all from the Shiqianfeng locality near Baode, Shanxi, part of the Sunjiagou Formation. Shanshisaurus xuecunensis Cheng, 1980 and Huanghesaurus liuliensis Gao, 1983 are synonyms.

S. completus (Wang, Yi and Liu, 2019); The first pareiasaur skull from Asia came from this species.

== Classification ==
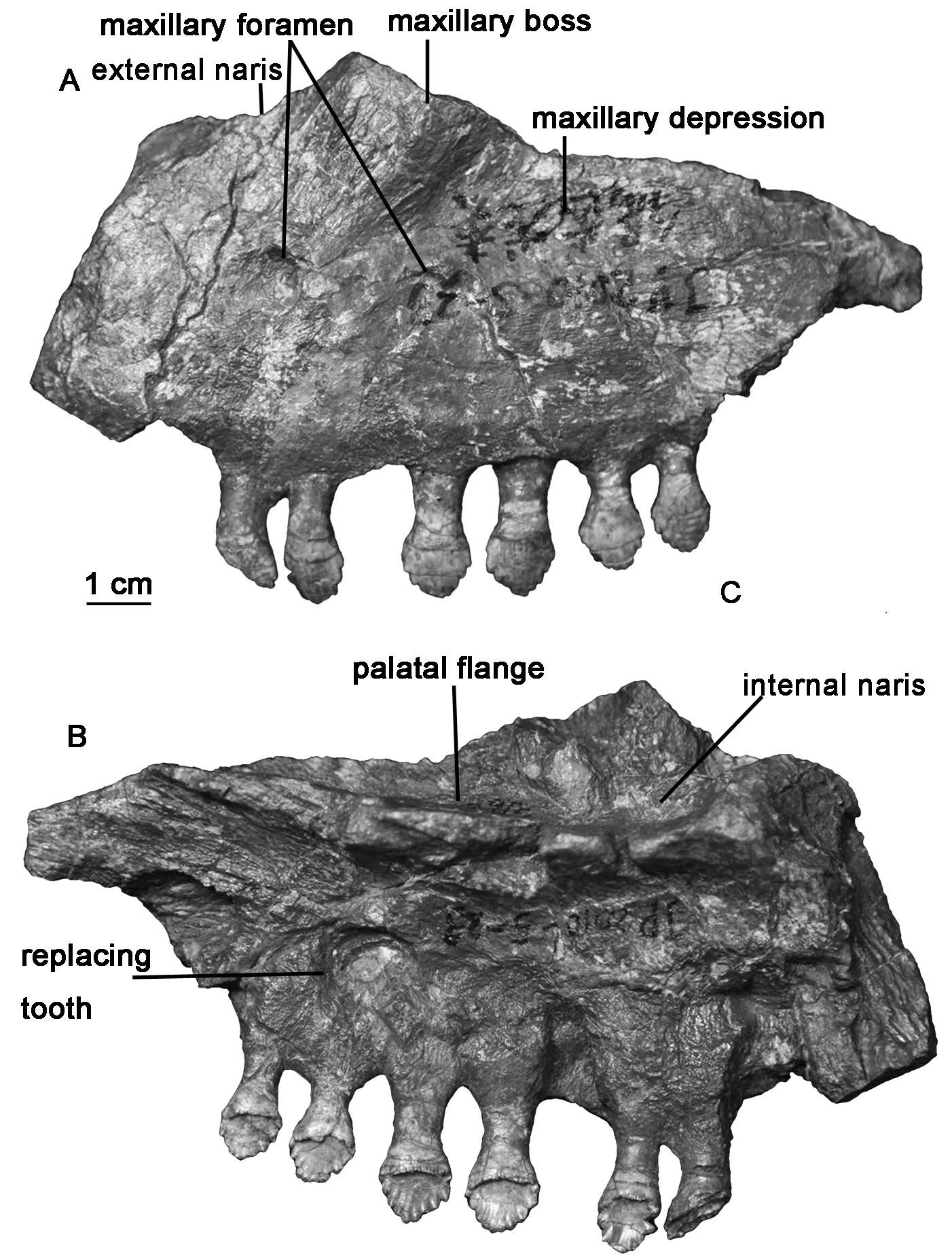
Maxilla of Honania complicidentata, which may be valid

Shihtienfenia is unusual because of the presence of 6, rather than the usual 4, sacral vertebrae, and may belong in a separate subfamily, although Oskar Kuhn includes it under the Pareiasaurines in his monograph (Kuhn 1969). As with the Pareiasaurines the upper margin of the ilium is flat.
