= Nikkasauridae =

Scientific classification
- Kingdom: Animalia
- Phylum: Chordata
- Clade: Synapsida
- Clade: Therapsida
- Suborder: †Biarmosuchia
- Family: †Nikkasauridae; Ivakhnenko, 2000

Genera
- †Nikkasaurus; †Reiszia

Extinct family of therapsids

Nikkasauridae is a family of biarmosuchian therapsids. It contains two genera: Nikkasaurus and Reiszia.
