= Reiszia =

Reiszia Temporal range: middle Permian

Scientific classification
- Domain: Eukaryota
- Kingdom: Animalia
- Phylum: Chordata
- Clade: Synapsida
- Clade: Therapsida
- Suborder: †Biarmosuchia
- Family: †Nikkasauridae
- Genus: †Reiszia

Species
- Reiszia gubini Ivakhnenko, 2000; Reiszia tippula Ivakhnenko, 2000

Extinct genus of therapsids

Reiszia is an extinct genus of therapsids from European Russia belonging to the family Nikkasauridae.

== Taxonomy ==
Two species are known, Reiszia gubini and R. tippula, both found in middle Permian sediments in the Mezen River Basin of European Russia. R. gubini is known from a partial skull and mandible, while R. tippula is known only from a mandible.

== See also ==
- List of therapsids
