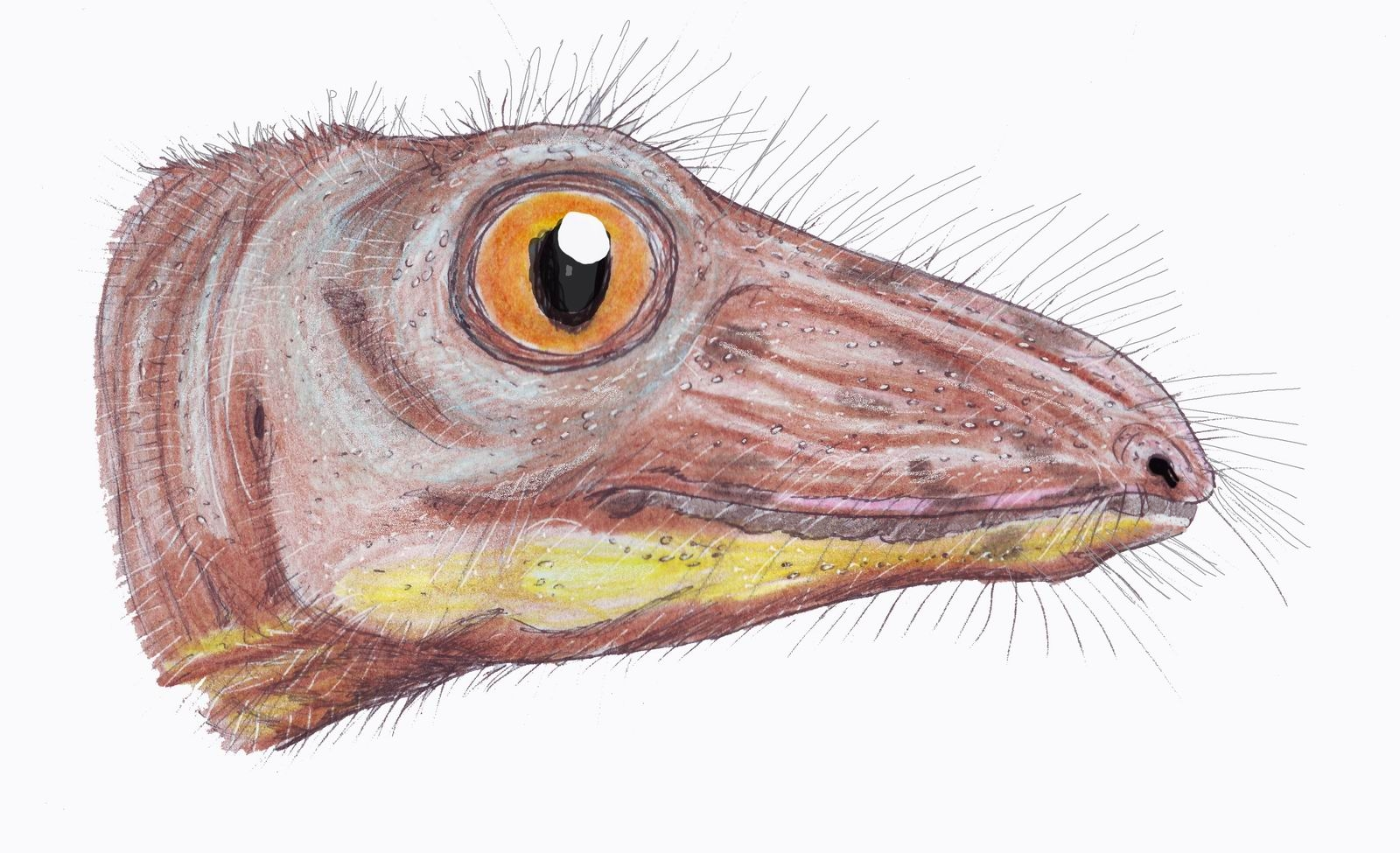

Scientific classification
- Kingdom: Animalia
- Phylum: Chordata
- Clade: Synapsida
- Clade: Therapsida
- Suborder: †Biarmosuchia
- Family: †Nikkasauridae
- Genus: †Nikkasaurus; Ivahnenko, 2000
- Species: †N. tatarinovi

Binomial name
- †Nikkasaurus tatarinovi Ivahnenko, 2000

= Nikkasaurus =

Nikkasaurus Temporal range: middle Permian

Extinct genus of mammal ancestors

Nikkasaurus is an extinct genus of therapsids first named and described by Ivakhnenko.

== Description ==
Nikkasaurus, named after Russian paleontologist Nikolay Kalandadze, was a small therapsid, with a skull about 5 cm long. The eyes had large orbits and scleral rings, and the head was tilted back, as with all therapsids. The skull looks superficially similar to those of the pelycosaurs, in particular members of Varanopidae.

== Biology ==
Nikkasaurus was probably mainly insectivorous, and possibly nocturnal.

== Systematics ==
The only known species is the type species N. tatarinovi, described by MF Ivahnenko in 2000, from the Middle Permian Mezen River Basin. Nikkasaurus is possibly a relic of a more ancient stage of therapsid development.

== See also ==
- List of therapsids
