= Malaya Nisogora =

Malaya Nisogora Малая Нисогора
- Village
- Location within Arkhangelsk Oblast Location within Russia
- Coordinates: 64°59′N 45°37′E
- Country: Russia
- Region: Arkhangelsk Oblast
- District: Leshukonsky District
- Time zone: UTC+3:00

Malaya Nisogora (Russian: Ма́лая Нисогора́) is a rural locality (a village) in Leshukonsky District, Arkhangelsk Oblast, Russia. The population was 14 as of 2012.

== Geography ==
Malaya Nisogora is located 21 km northwest of Leshukonskoye (the district's administrative centre) by road. Bolshaya Nisogora is the nearest rural locality.
