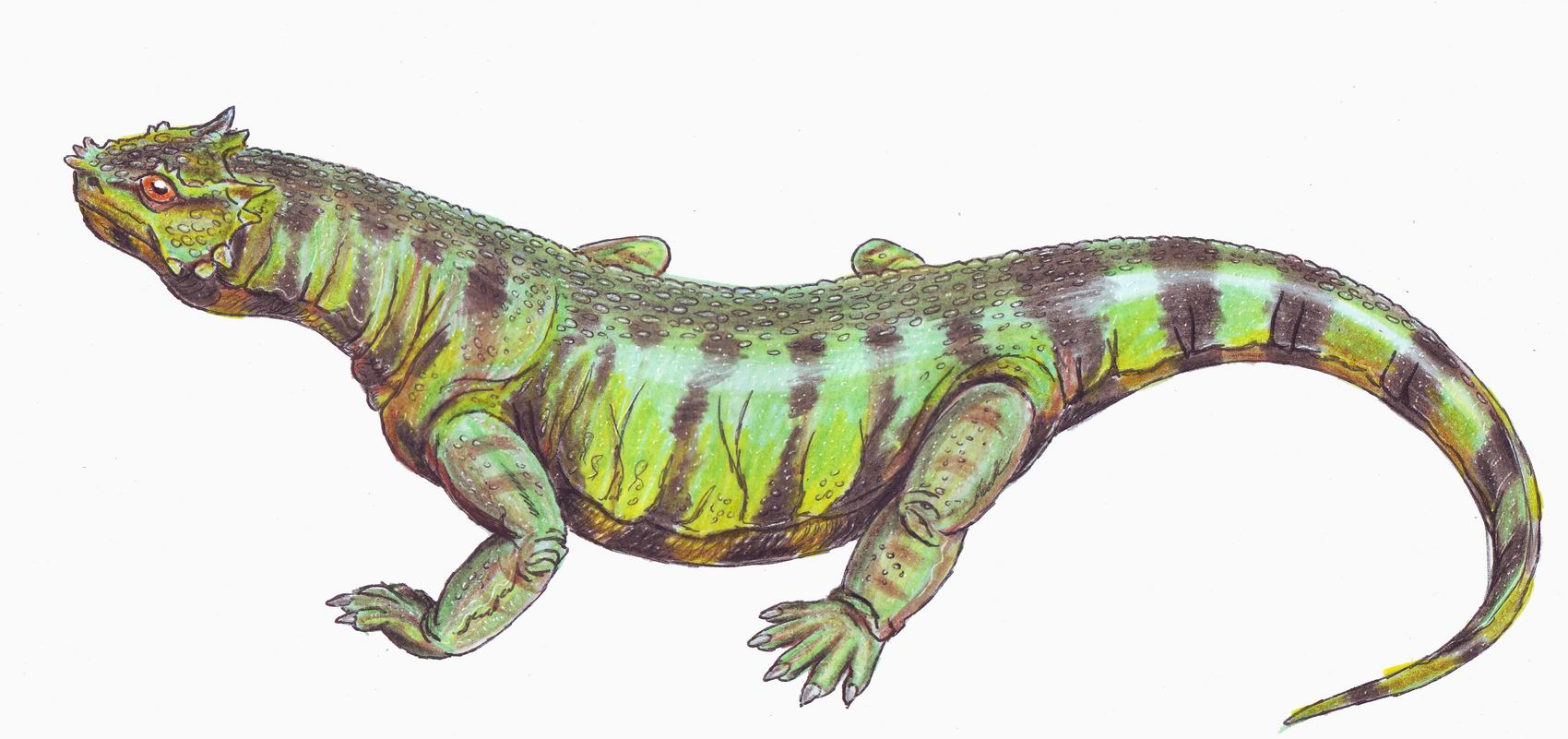
- Life restoration (with highly speculative skull)

Scientific classification
- Kingdom: Animalia
- Phylum: Chordata
- Class: Reptilia
- Family: †Nycteroleteridae
- Genus: †Rhipaeosaurus; Efremov, 1940

Type species
- †Rhipaeosaurus tricuspidens Efremov, 1940

= Rhipaeosaurus =

Rhipaeosaurus Temporal range: Middle Permian, Capitanian

Extinct genus of reptiles

Rhipaeosaurus is an extinct genus of nycteroleterid parareptile known from an articulated skeleton from the mid Middle Permian of European Russia. It contained a single species, Rhipaeosaurus tricuspidens. A bayesian analysis suggests that it is more closely related to pareiasaurs than to the other nycteroleterids, due to skull and tooth features. For this reason, "Nycteroleteridae" may be a grade rather than a clade, unless redefined to exclude Rhipaeosaurus.

== Description ==
Rhipaeosaurus is around a meter long, larger than any other "nycteroleterids" and closer in size to later pareiasaurs. Postcranial remains were similar to Macroleter, though the limbs were more robust and the ankle bones were unfused. The teeth were flattened and tricuspid (possessing three cusps), seemingly intermediate in form between the one- or two-cusped teeth of earlier nycteroleterids and the multi-cusped teeth of pareiasaurs. Many components of the partial skull and skeleton (which was originally fairly complete) had been lost or degraded between 1940 and 2012, obscuring most aspects of its anatomy.

== History ==
Rhipaeosaurus was first described in 1940, from a fairly complete skeleton found in the Ural Mountains of Russia. The name 'Rhipaeosaurus' comes from 'Ῥιπαεος' 'Rhipaeos, a range of mountains in Greek mythology thought to be the Urals, and 'σαυρος', meaning 'lizard'. 'Tricuspidens' refers to its three-cusped teeth.

Rhipaeosaurus' taxonomic history has been full of difficulties. At first it was placed in its own family, the Rhipaeosauridae, and considered the type species. Other taxa, such as Parabradysaurus and Leptoropha, later joined it in this family. However, when more remains of these additional taxa were found, they were determined not to be rhipaeosaurids at all. Parabradysaurus was found to be an estemnosuchid, more closely related to mammals, and Leptoropha was identified as a seymouriamorph amphibian. Rhipaeosaurus's status as a parareptile is still considered relatively stable, either as a basal nycteroleterid or a transitional taxon between other "nycteroleterids" and pareiasaurus.
