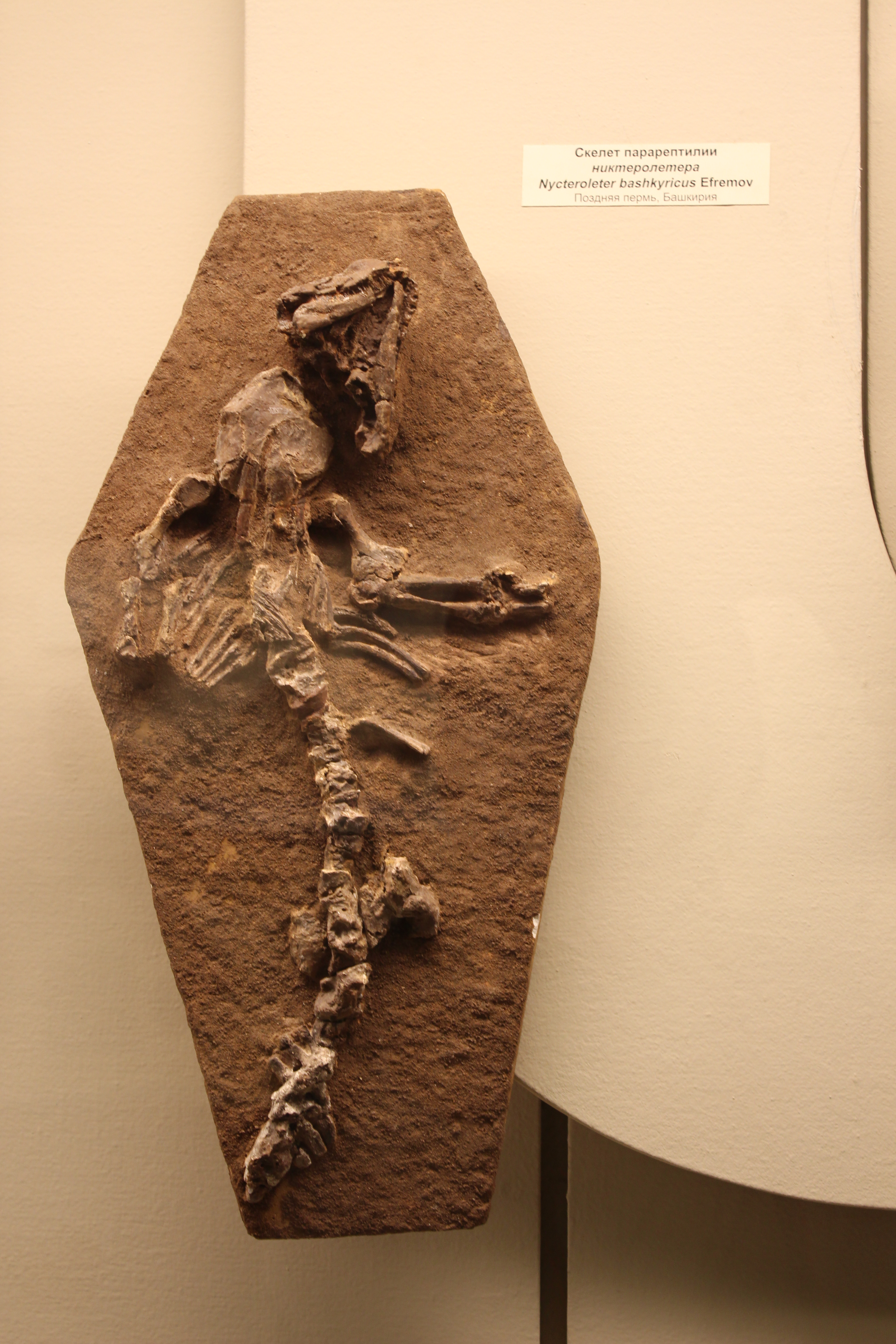
- Fossil of N. bashkyricus in Moscow Paleontological Museum

Scientific classification
- Domain: Eukaryota
- Kingdom: Animalia
- Phylum: Chordata
- Clade: †Parareptilia
- Order: †Procolophonomorpha
- Family: †Nycteroleteridae
- Genus: †Nycteroleter; Efremov, 1938

Type species
- †Nycteroleter ineptus Efremov, 1938

= Nycteroleter =

Nycteroleter Temporal range: Guadalupian

Genus of reptiles (fossil)

Nycteroleter is an extinct genus of nycteroleterid parareptile known from the Middle Permian of European Russia. Fossils were first found in the Mezen River, near to Arkhangelsk. Within the Nycteroleteridae, it is considered most closely related to Emeroleter. However, its legs were shorter than those of Emeroleter and its skull was flatter. Nycteroleter was insectivorous, and may have been nocturnal. It was a small animal, less than a metre long.

== Classification ==
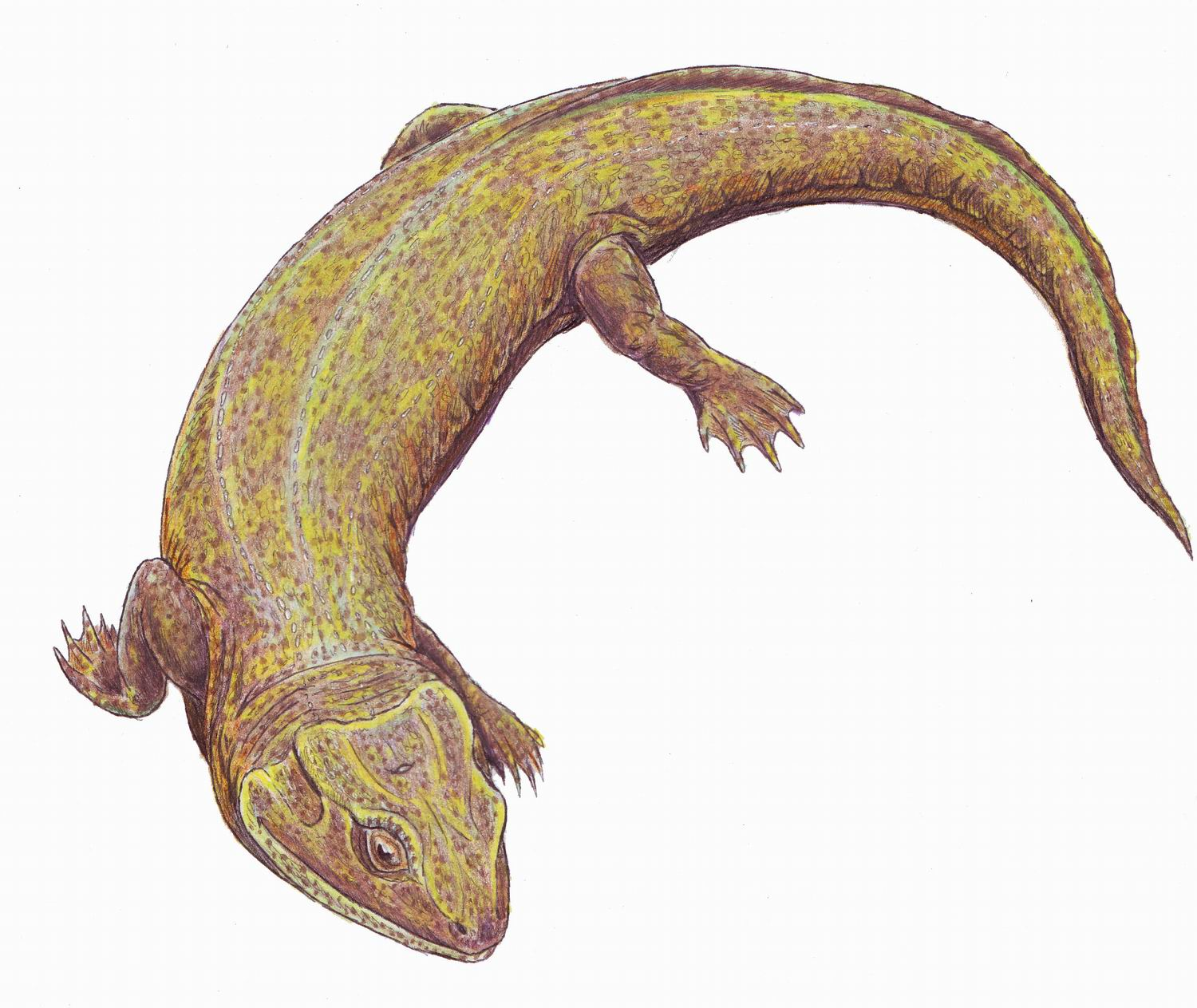
Life restoration of N. ineptus

Nycteroleter is classified as a primitive procolophonian, related to the Pareisauridae. It is not certain whether the nycteroleterids formed a monophyletic or polyphyletic group, as Rhipaeosaurus seems to be more similar to pareisaurids than to other nycteroleterids. Previously, it was uncertain whether nycteroleterids were parareptiles or reptile-like amphibians.
