= Emeroleter =

Emeroleter Temporal range: Late Permian, Wuchiapingian
- CT rendering of KPM uncat/E2, a skull referred to E. levis

Scientific classification
- Kingdom: Animalia
- Phylum: Chordata
- Class: Reptilia
- Family: †Nycteroleteridae
- Genus: †Emeroleter; Ivakhnenko, 1997

Type species
- †Emeroleter levis Ivakhnenko, 1997

Extinct genus of reptiles

Emeroleter is an extinct genus of nycteroleterid parareptile known from the early Late Permian of European Russia. It was a long-legged lizard-like small animal with a length about 30 cm.

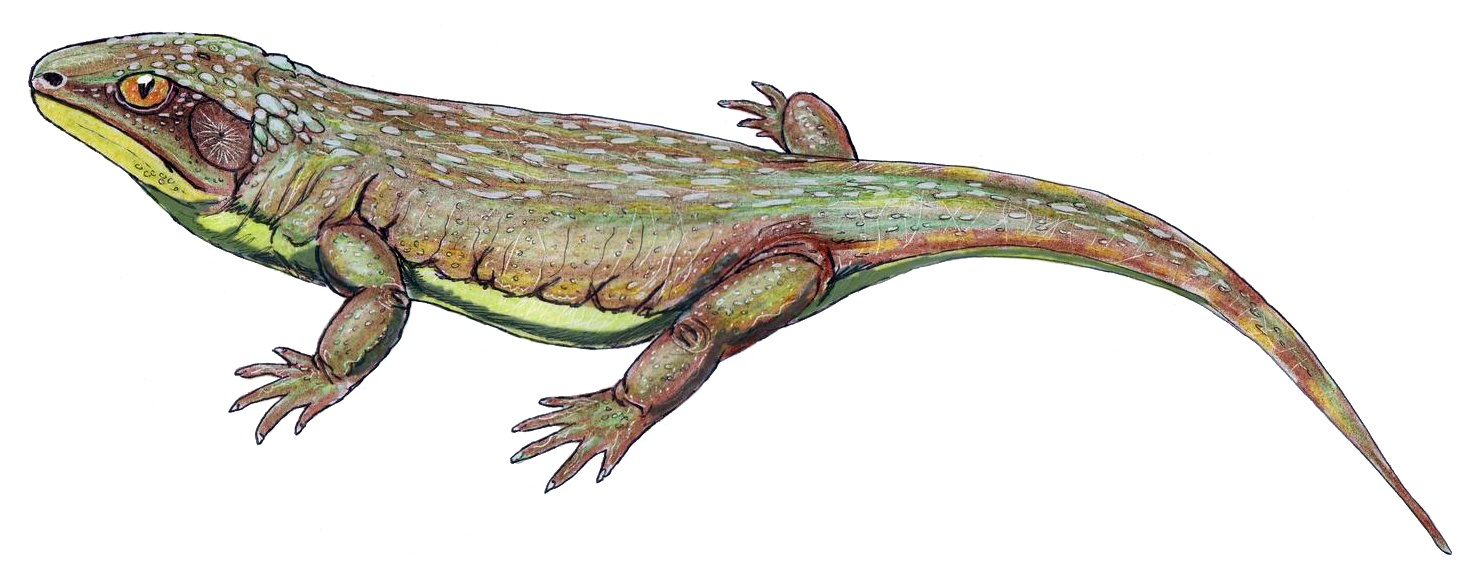
Life restoration
