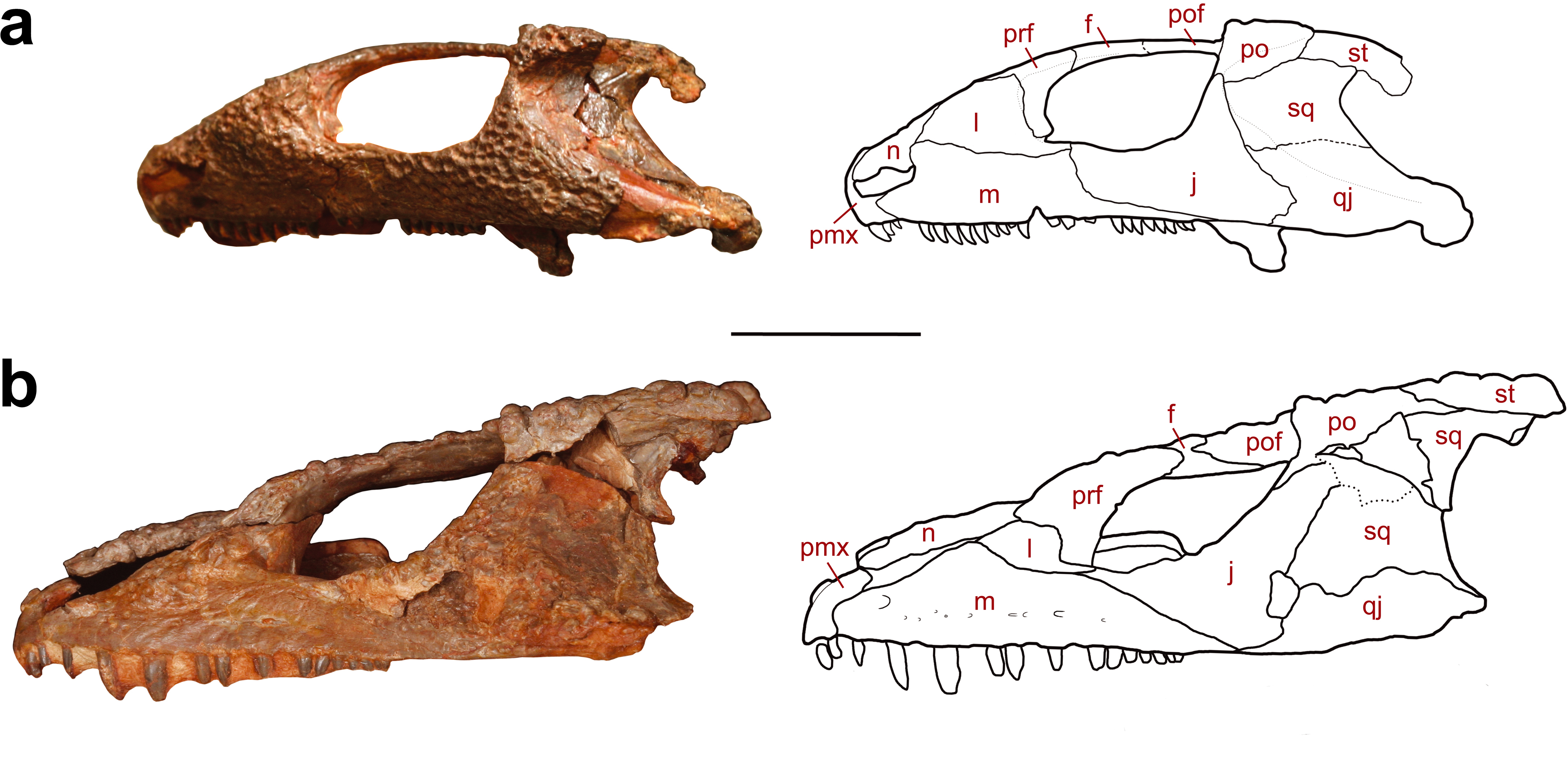
- Skull photo and diagram of Bashkyroleter mesensis and Macroleter poezicus

Scientific classification
- Domain: Eukaryota
- Kingdom: Animalia
- Phylum: Chordata
- Clade: †Parareptilia
- Order: †Procolophonomorpha
- Family: †Nycteroleteridae
- Genus: †Macroleter; Tverdochlebova & Ivachnenko, 1984

Type species
- †Macroleter poezicus Tverdochlebova & Ivachnenko, 1984

Species
- M. poezicus Tverdochlebova & Ivachnenko, 1984 (type); M. agilis (Olson, 1980 [originally Seymouria agilis]) Reisz & Laurin, 2001

Synonyms
- Seymouria agilis Olson, 1980; Tokosaurus Tverdochlebova and Ivachnenko, 1984; Tokosaurus perforatus Tverdochlebova and Ivachnenko, 1984 (of M. poezicus)

= Macroleter =

Macroleter Temporal range: Late Permian, 264 Ma

Extinct genus of reptiles

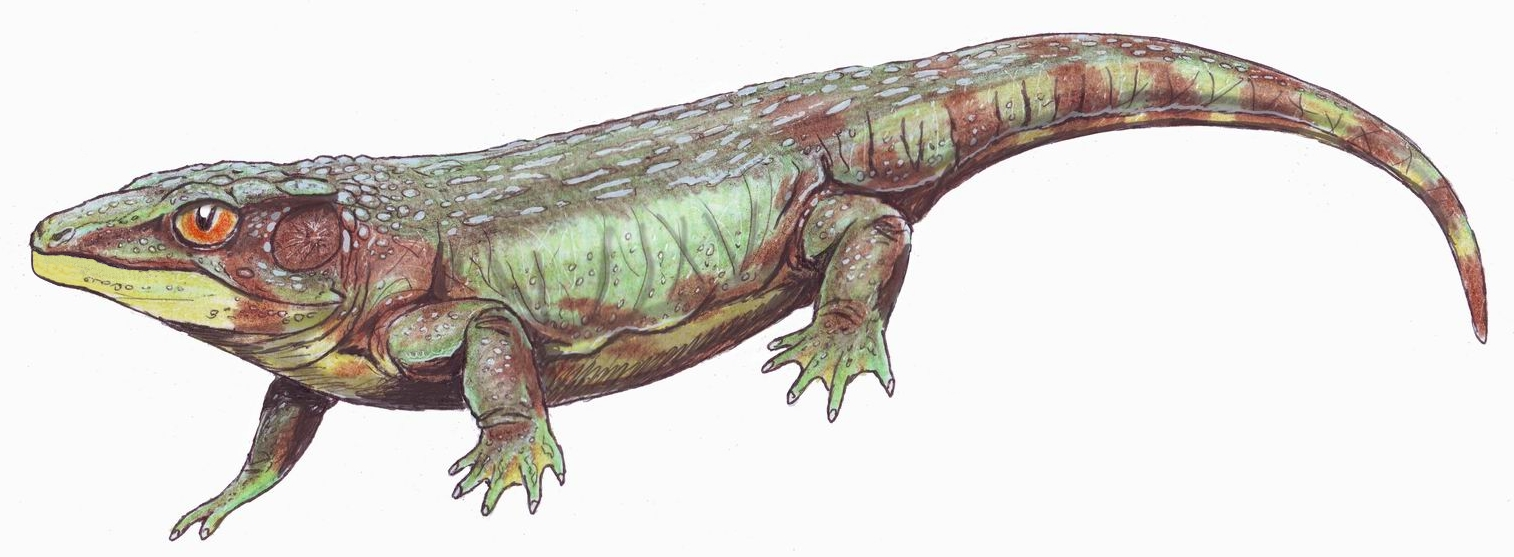
Restoration

Macroleter is an extinct genus of nycteroleterid parareptile which existed in Oklahoma and Russia during the upper Permian period. It was a quite generalized primitive reptile, in many ways resembling their amphibian ancestors. It was first named by paleontologists Tverdochlebova and Ivachnenko in 1984. According to classification by Michel Laurin and Robert R. Reisz, the genus is a parareptile, belonging to the same branch as Millerettidae, Procolophonidae and other generalized anapsid reptiles. The type species is Macroleter poezicus from Upper Permian of Russia.

Macroleter had an 8 cm skull, and an overall length of 75 cm. It was generally lizard-like in build with a rather flat and broad skull. The teeth were small and pointy, indication it predominantly hunted insects and other small invertebrates.

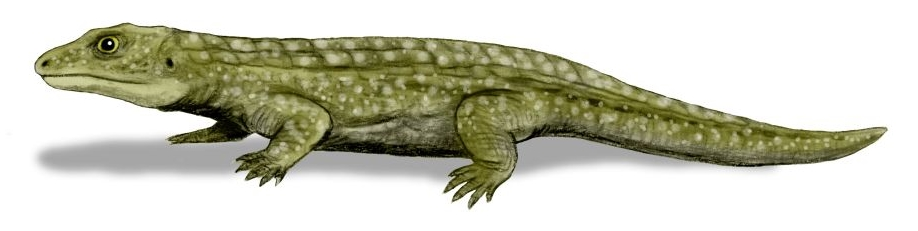
Restoration of "Tokosaurus perforatus", a juvenile M. poezicus

Seymouria agilis (Olson, 1980) that is known from only one specimen (holotype UCMP 143 277) was originally thought to be a reptile-like amphibian and assigned to the genus Seymouria. The find consists of a nearly complete skeleton from the Chickasha Formation of Oklahoma. In 2001, the find was reassigned by Laurin and Reisz to Macroleter. Tokosaurus, another parareptile thought to be closely related to Macroleter, has also been reassigned to Macroleter and considered to be a juvenile of M. poezicus as they are known from the same locality.
