= Changhsingian =

Ninth and last stage of the Permian

- 254.14 ± 0.07 – 251.902 ± 0.024 Ma
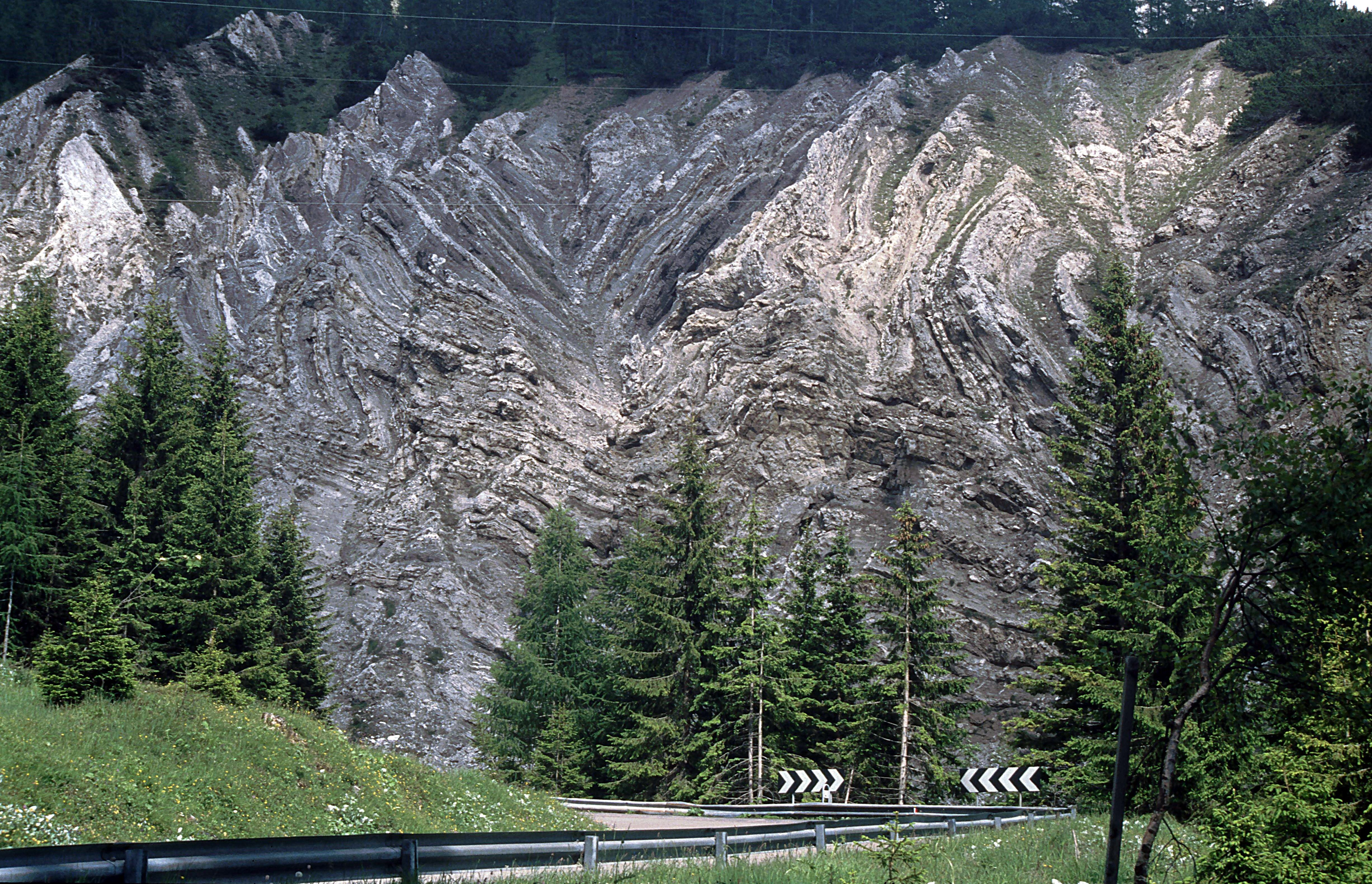
- Bellerophon Formation, Dolomites, Italy

Chronology
← / Permian-Triassic mass extinction event; ← / end-Capitanian extinction event; ← / Olson's Extinction
Subdivision of the Permian according to the ICS, as of 2023. Vertical axis scale: Millions of years ago

Etymology
- Name formality: Formal
- Name ratified: 1981
- Alternate spelling(s): Changxingian

Usage information
- Celestial body: Earth
- Regional usage: Global (ICS)
- Time scale(s) used: ICS Time Scale

Definition
- Chronological unit: Age
- Stratigraphic unit: Stage
- Time span formality: Formal
- Lower boundary definition: FAD of the Conodont Clarkina wangi
- Lower boundary GSSP: Meishan, Zhejiang, China; 31.0819°N 119.7064°E
- Lower GSSP ratified: 2005
- Upper boundary definition: FAD of the Conodont Hindeodus parvus.
- Upper boundary GSSP: Meishan, Zhejiang, China; 31.0798°N 119.7058°E
- Upper GSSP ratified: 2001

In the geologic time scale, the Changhsingian or Changxingian is the latest age or uppermost stage of the Permian period and the Paleozoic era as a whole. It is also the upper or latest of two subdivisions of the Lopingian Epoch or Series. The Changhsingian lasted from 254.14 to 251.902 Ma ago. It is preceded by the Wuchiapingian age/stage and is followed by the Induan age/stage (Early Triassic epoch).

The greatest mass extinction in the Phanerozoic eon, the Permian–Triassic extinction event, occurred around the end of this age.

== Stratigraphic definitions ==
The Changhsingian is named after Changxing (Chinese: 长兴; pinyin: Chángxīng; Wade–Giles: Ch'ang-hsing) in northern Zhejiang, China. The stage was named for the Changhsing Limestone. The name was first used for a stage in 1970 and was anchored in the international timescale in 1981.

The base of the Changhsingian Stage is at the first appearance of the conodont species Clarkina wangi. The global reference profile is profile D at Meishan, in the type area in Changxing, just below the Changhsingian foraminifer index fossil Palaeofusulina and the first appearance of the ammonoid Tapashanites. The top of the Changhsingian (the base of the Induan Stage and the Triassic System) is at the first appearance of the conodont species Hindeodus parvus. In the second part of the 20th century, appearance of the ammonite Otoceras, that existed no more than 100,000 years, in the boreal region was considered a marker of the Lower Triassic boundary. However, a more detailed study of Lower Induan biostratigraphy revealed the diachronicity of the appearance of these mollusks in different regions of the Earth.

The Changhsingian contains only one ammonoid biozone: that of the genus Iranites.

== Changhsingian life ==
The Changhsingian ended with the Permian–Triassic extinction event, the largest mass extinction event of the Phanerozoic Era, when both global biodiversity and alpha diversity (community-level diversity) were devastated.

On land, the Changhsingian fauna comprised gorgonopsid synapsids like Inostrancevia, anomodont synapsids like Daptocephalus and Dicynodon, and parareptiles like Elginia, milleretids and Nanoparia.

Among fishes, the bobasatraniiforms Bobasatrania and Ebenaqua are known from Changhsingian deposits of Greenland and Australia, respectively. Another deep-bodied fish, Sinoplatysomus, is known from Zhejiang province of China, along with the elongate saurichthyiform Eosaurichthys and the coelacanths Changxingia and Youngichthys. Within the Eugeneodontida, the helicoprionids are represented by the genus Sinohelicoprion; as well as some edestids such as Helicampodus; and other eugeneodontids. Several fish genera were described from Changhsingian deposits of Russia and South Africa. The Hambast Formation of Iran yielded chondrichthyan faunas of Wuchiapingian to Changhsingian age.

The conodont Vjalovognathus carinatus is known from the Selong Formation of Tibet; more common conodonts include the genera Clarkina and Hindeodus.

Changhsingian aged beds of the Tesero Member of the Werfen Formation produced fossils of a crown group echinoid, Eotiaris teseroensis and other taxa.

The Paratirolites Limestone near Julfa (Azerbaijan, Iran) contains a diverse pre-extinction ammonoid fauna, including the genera Neoaganides, Pseudogastrioceras, Dzhulfites, Paratirolites, Julfotirolites, Alibashites, Abichites, Stoyanowites and Arasella

The Bellerophon Formation in northern Italy documents a pre-extinction bivalve community with 26 species adapted to stressful conditions (high temperatures, high salinity, shallow water depths, low oxygen and high terrigenous input). The formation is otherwise known for abundant Bellerophon fossils.

Only a few trilobite genera are present by the Changhsingian, mostly of the family Phillipsiidae. One of the last of the Trilobita include the genus Kathwaia of Pakistan and the Caucasus. Perhaps the most widespread and diverse genus was Pseudophillipsia, members of the subgenus Ditomopyge (Carniphillipsia) were the other most common group. Few non-phillipsid trilobites remained, such as those of Brachymetopus (Acutimetopus). Other trilobites, of the Phillipsidae, include Acropyge, Paraphillipsia, and Timorcranium.

In Australia, fossils of one of the last surviving eurypterids, Woodwardopterus? freemanorum, were found.

== Notable formations ==
- Ali Bashi Formation (Armenia, Azerbaijan, Iran)
- Bellerophon Formation (Italy)
- Dalong formation (Yangtze, China)
- Hambast Formation (Iran)
- Hopeman Sandstone Formation (Scotland)
- Moradi Formation (Niger)
- Quartermaster Formation (Texas, USA)
- Schuchert Dal Formation (Greenland)
- Tesero Member of the Werfen Formation (Austria, Bosnia and Herzegovina, Italy)
- Lower part of Wordie Creek Formation (Greenland)
