= Tapashanites =

Tapashanites Temporal range: Changhsingian

Scientific classification
- Domain: Eukaryota
- Kingdom: Animalia
- Phylum: Mollusca
- Class: Cephalopoda
- Subclass: †Ammonoidea
- Order: †Ceratitida
- Family: †Tapashanitidae
- Genus: †Tapashanites; Zhao & Liang, 1965

Extinct genus of ammonoids

Tapashanites is a genus of ammonites in the family Tapashanitidae of the order Ceratitida. The genus is used as an index fossil for the Changhsingian stage of the Late Permian because its first appearance is only 42 cm (17 in) above the base of the Changhsingian (FAD of Clarkina wangi)
