= Urosthenes =

Urosthenes Temporal range: Wuchiapingian?–Middle Triassic

Scientific classification
- Domain: Eukaryota
- Kingdom: Animalia
- Phylum: Chordata
- Class: Actinopterygii
- Order: †Palaeonisciformes
- Family: †Urostheneidae
- Genus: †Urosthenes; Dana, 1848

Type species
- †Urosthenes australis Dana, 1848

Other species
- †U. latus Woodward, 1931

Extinct genus of fishes

Urosthenes is an extinct genus of prehistoric bony fish that lived during the Lopingian (late Permian) to Middle Triassic epochs in what is now New South Wales, Australia.

The type species is U. australis, described from Middle Triassic deposits. The second species, U. latus, was found in Permian (Wuchiapingian?) aged rock layers and was first described in 1931 by Arthur Smith Woodward, based on a specimen found in Lithgow, New South Wales.

== Appearance ==
Urosthenes had a short and round body with large and veil-like fins almost symmetrical in shape. The ventral fins were closer to the head and also were quite large compared to the body, and similarly the dorsal and anal fins. Contrary to most other archaic actinopterygians, Urosthenes had very thin scales.

== See also ==
- Prehistoric fish
- List of prehistoric bony fish
