= Inichthys =

Inichthys Temporal range: Wuchiapingian

Scientific classification
- Kingdom: Animalia
- Phylum: Chordata
- Class: Actinopterygii
- Genus: †Inichthys; Kazantseva-Selezneva, 1979
- Species: †I. gorelovae

Binomial name
- †Inichthys gorelovae Kazantseva-Selezneva, 1979

Extinct genus of fishes

Inichthys is an extinct genus of prehistoric freshwater ray-finned fish that lived during the Wuchiapingian stage of the Lopingian (late Permian) epoch. Fossils were recovered in the Uskat Formation in the Kuznetsk Basin of Siberia in Russia, and were identified from a drill core.

== See also ==
- Prehistoric fish
- List of prehistoric bony fish
