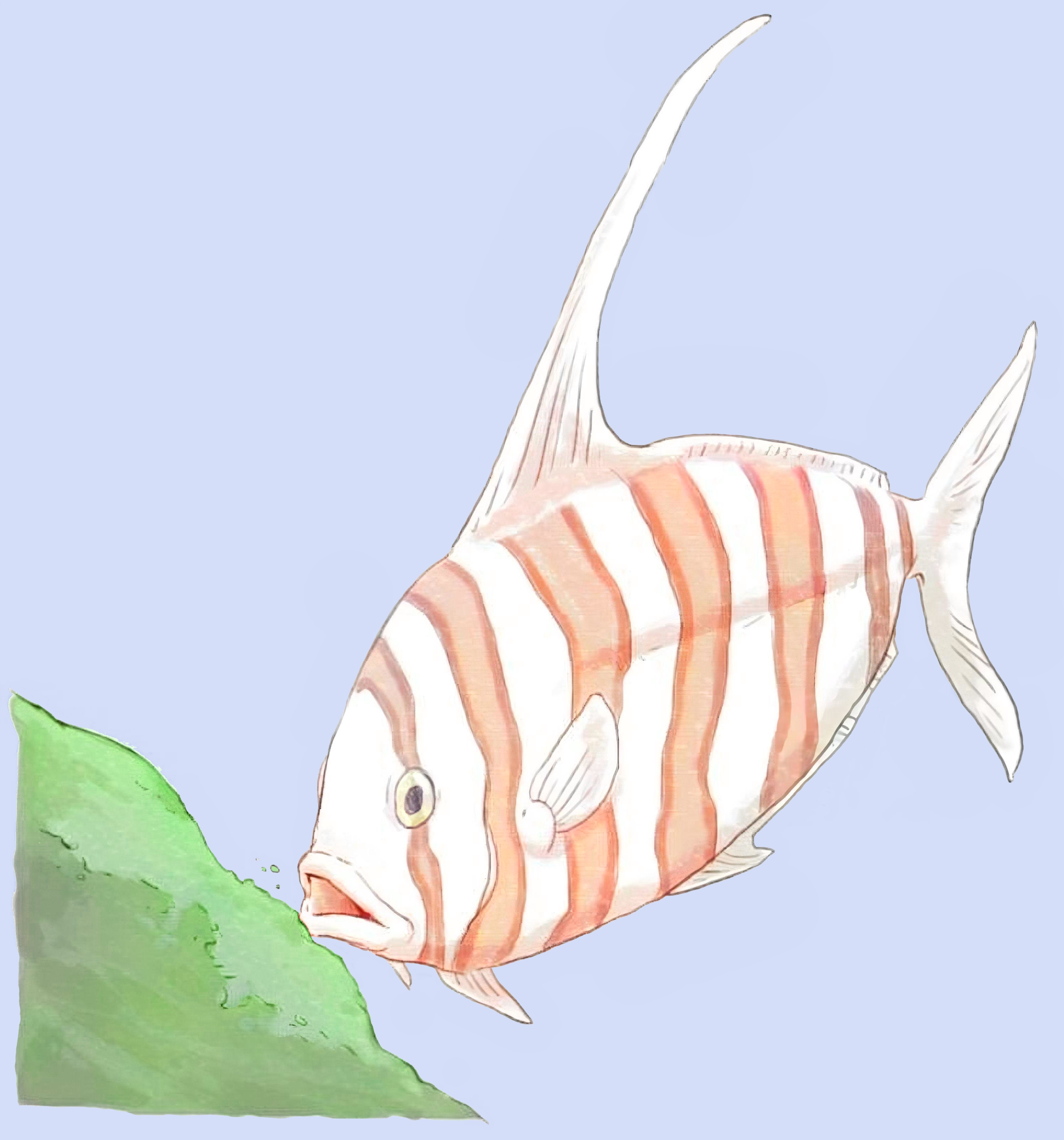
- Restoration of Dorypterus hoffmani

Scientific classification
- Kingdom: Animalia
- Phylum: Chordata
- Class: Actinopterygii
- Order: †Bobasatraniiformes
- Family: †Dorypteridae; Gill, 1925
- Genus: †Dorypterus; Germar, 1842

Type species
- †Dorypterus hoffmanni Germar, 1842

Other species
- †D. althausi (Münster, 1842)

= Dorypterus =

Dorypterus Temporal range: Wuchiapingian ~259.1–254.14 Ma

Extinct genus of fishes

Dorypterus is a small, extinct genus of prehistoric marine ray-finned fish. It lived during the Wuchiapingian stage of the late Permian epoch in what is now Germany (Kupferschiefer) and England (Marl Slate). Indeterminate remains are known from Hunan, China. It is a hypsisomatic bobasatraniiform with a high dorsal fin. Due to anatomical differences with other bobasatraniiforms, such as the presence of pelvic fins and the reduced scale cover, Dorypterus is placed in its own monotypic family, Dorypteridae.

Two species are known, D. hoffmanni and D. althausi, which are distinguished by differences in length of the dorsal fin. Whereas D. hoffmanni has a long dorsal fin, the dorsal fin of D. althausi is short. However, it is possible that this difference is due to sexual dimorphism, and that D. althausi represents the female phenotype of D. hoffmanni. More recent surveys have D. hoffmanni as the only species in the genus.

Dorypterus, with its deep body, was likely adapted for a slow-swimming lifestyle akin to modern reef fishes. It likely inhabited shallow lagoons dominated by large forests of algae, which it fed on with its scissor-like jaws. It may have been preyed upon by Coelacanthus.

== See also ==
- Prehistoric fish
- List of prehistoric bony fish
