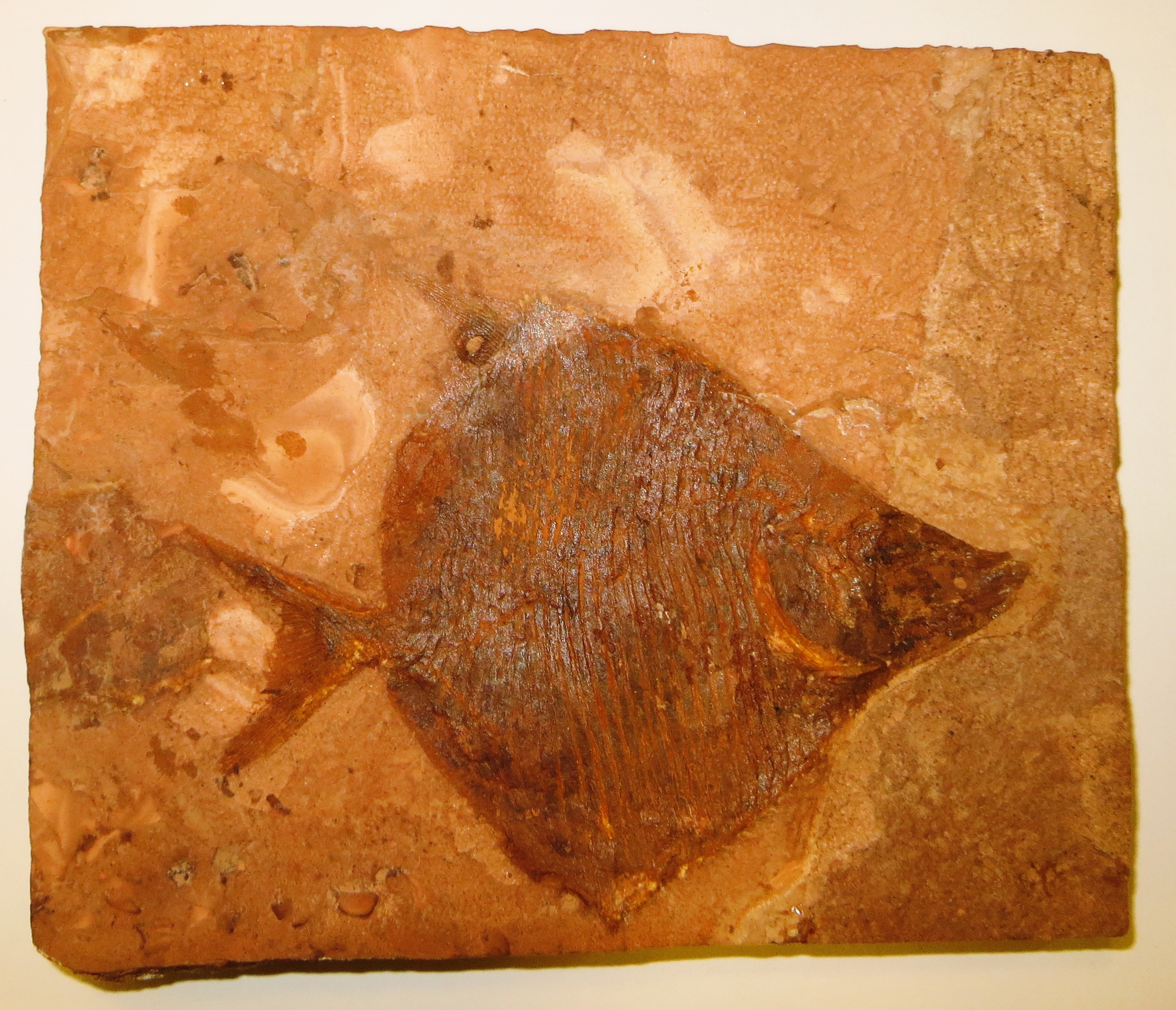
- Ebenaqua ritchiei fossil

Scientific classification
- Kingdom: Animalia
- Phylum: Chordata
- Class: Actinopterygii
- Order: †Bobasatraniiformes
- Family: †Bobasatraniidae
- Genus: †Ebenaqua; Campbell & Phuoc, 1983
- Species: †E. ritchei

Binomial name
- †Ebenaqua ritchei Campbell & Phuoc, 1983

= Ebenaqua =

Ebenaqua Temporal range: Changhsingian

Extinct genus of fishes

Ebenaqua (from Latin ebenus ("black") + aqua ("water"), referencing the type locality) is an extinct genus of freshwater bobasatraniiform ray-finned fish that lived during the Lopingian (late Permian) epoch of Australia. It contains a single species, E. ritchiei, known from the Changhsingian-aged Rangal Coal Measures of what is now Blackwater, Queensland, Australia.

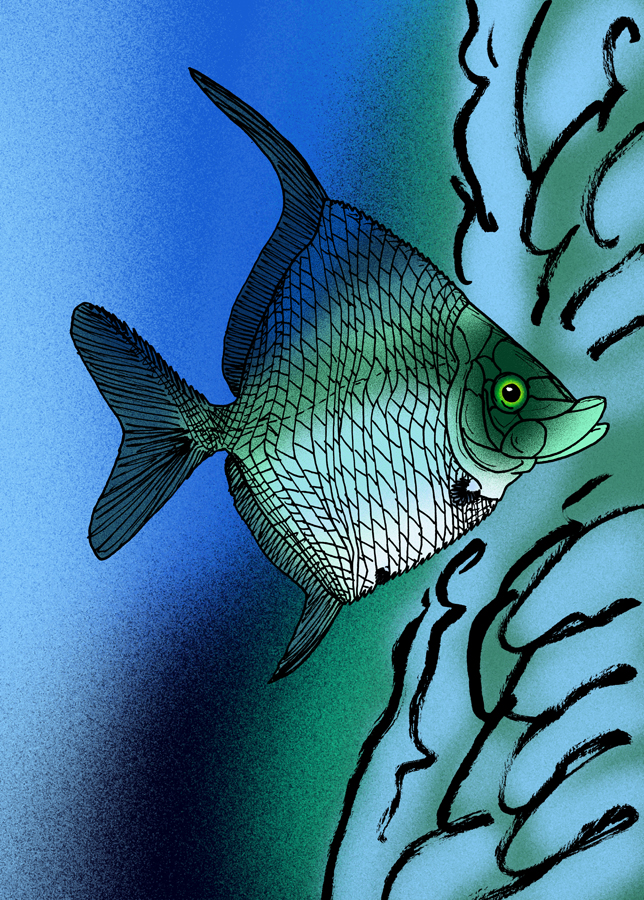
Artist's restoration

== See also ==
- Prehistoric fish
- List of prehistoric bony fish
