= Dzhulfitidae =

Dzhulfitidae Temporal range: Upper Permian–Lower Triassic

Scientific classification
- Domain: Eukaryota
- Kingdom: Animalia
- Phylum: Mollusca
- Class: Cephalopoda
- Subclass: †Ammonoidea
- Order: †Ceratitida
- Superfamily: †Xenodiscoidea
- Family: †Dzhulfitidae; Shevyrev 1965

Genera
- Abichites; Dzhulfites; Paratirolites

Extinct family of molluscs

Dzhulfitidae is a small extinct family of Upper Permian and Lower Triassic ammonoids from Asia, included in the ceratitid Xenodiscoidea and containing only three genera: Abachites, Dzhulfites, and Paratirolites.

Dzhulfitidae was named by Shevyrev in 1965 to contain Dzhulfites and Abachites also named by him at that time. Paratirolites was removed from its previous position in the Ceratitaceae.

Species of dzhulfitid genera have been found in Upper Permian and/or Lower Triassic sediments in Armenia, Azerbaijan, Iran, Afghanistan, Thailand, and Japan.
