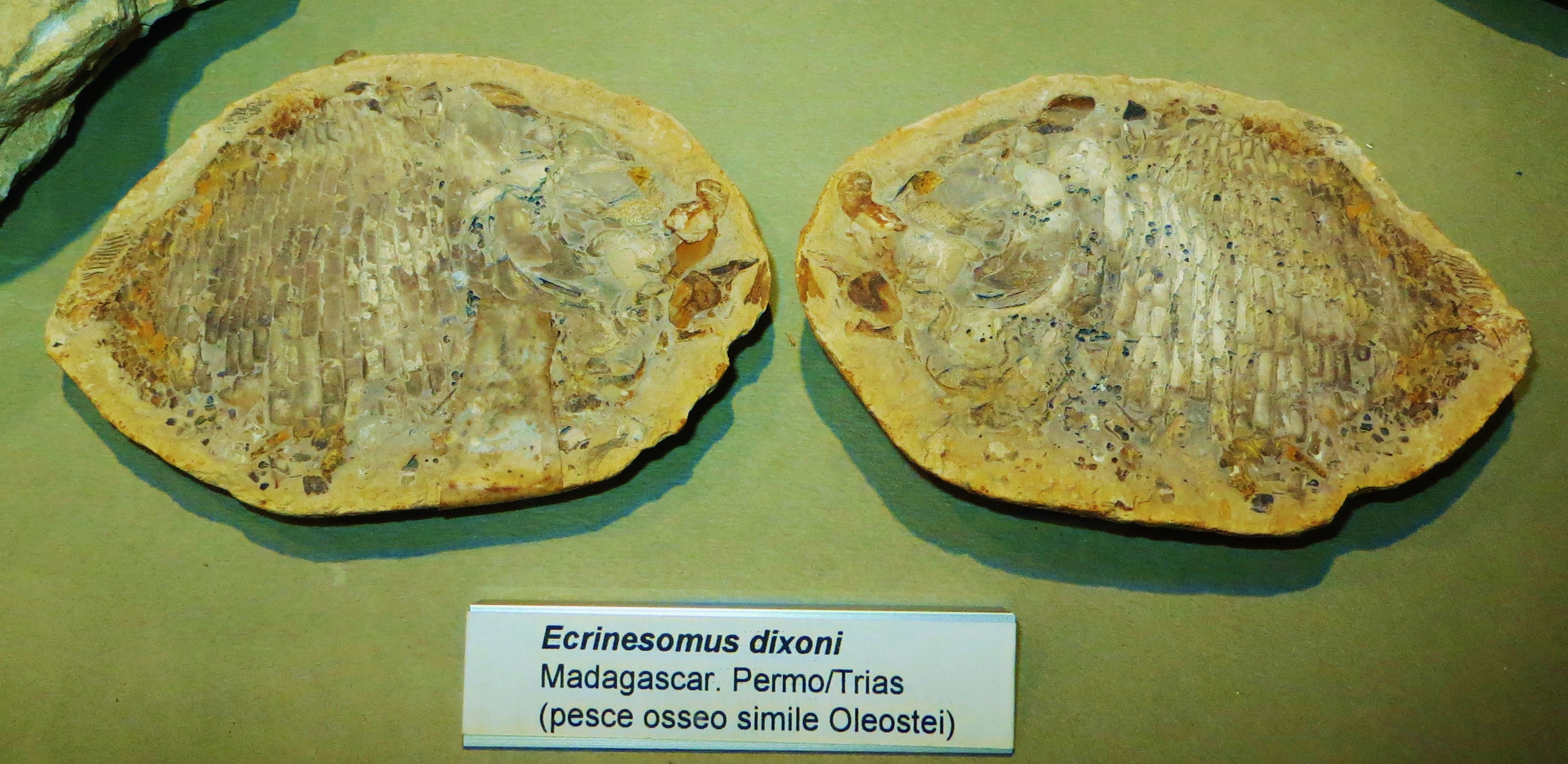
- Ecrinesomus dixoni fossil

Scientific classification
- Kingdom: Animalia
- Phylum: Chordata
- Class: Actinopterygii
- Order: †Bobasatraniiformes
- Family: †Bobasatraniidae
- Genus: †Ecrinesomus; Woodward, 1910
- Species: †E. dixoni

Binomial name
- †Ecrinesomus dixoni Woodward, 1910

= Ecrinesomus =

Ecrinesomus Temporal range: Induan

Extinct genus of fishes

Ecrinesomus is an extinct genus of prehistoric marine bobasatraniiform ray-finned fish that lived during the late Induan age of the Early Triassic epoch. It is known from the Sakamena Formation of Madagascar.

== Appearance ==
Ecrinesomus co-occurred with the relatively similar looking Bobasatrania. Fossils of these two genera are sometimes misidentified, but can be distinguished based on the following characters: the number of scale rows (Ecrinesomus has ca. 48 transversal scale rows, Bobasatrania has fewer), the body shape (Ecrinesomus has an elliptical, Bobasatrania a rhombic body outline) and the distinct skull bone pattern.

== See also ==
- Prehistoric fish
- List of prehistoric bony fish
