= Liuchengoceratidae =

Scientific classification
- Kingdom: Animalia
- Phylum: Mollusca
- Class: Cephalopoda
- Subclass: †Ammonoidea
- Order: †Ceratitida
- Superfamily: †Xenodiscoidea
- Family: †Liuchengoceratidae; Zhao, 1978

Genera
- Liuchengoceras; Rongjiangoceras; Wangrenoceras

Extinct family of molluscs

Liuchengoceratidae is an extinct family of cephalopods belonging to the ammonite subclass in the order Ceratitida.
