= Quartermaster Formation =

Geologic formation in Texas, United States

- Stratigraphic range: Changhsingian; ~254–252.3 Ma
- Type: Formation
- Sub-units: Doxey Member

Lithology
- Primary: Dolomite

Location
- Coordinates: 34.6°N 101.2°W
- Approximate paleocoordinates: 2.7°N 30.7°W
- Region: Texas
- Country: United States
- Quartermaster Formation (the United States) Quartermaster Formation (Texas)

The Quartermaster Formation is a geologic formation in Texas. It preserves fossils dating back to the Permian period.

== See also ==
- List of fossiliferous stratigraphic units in Texas
- Paleontology in Texas
