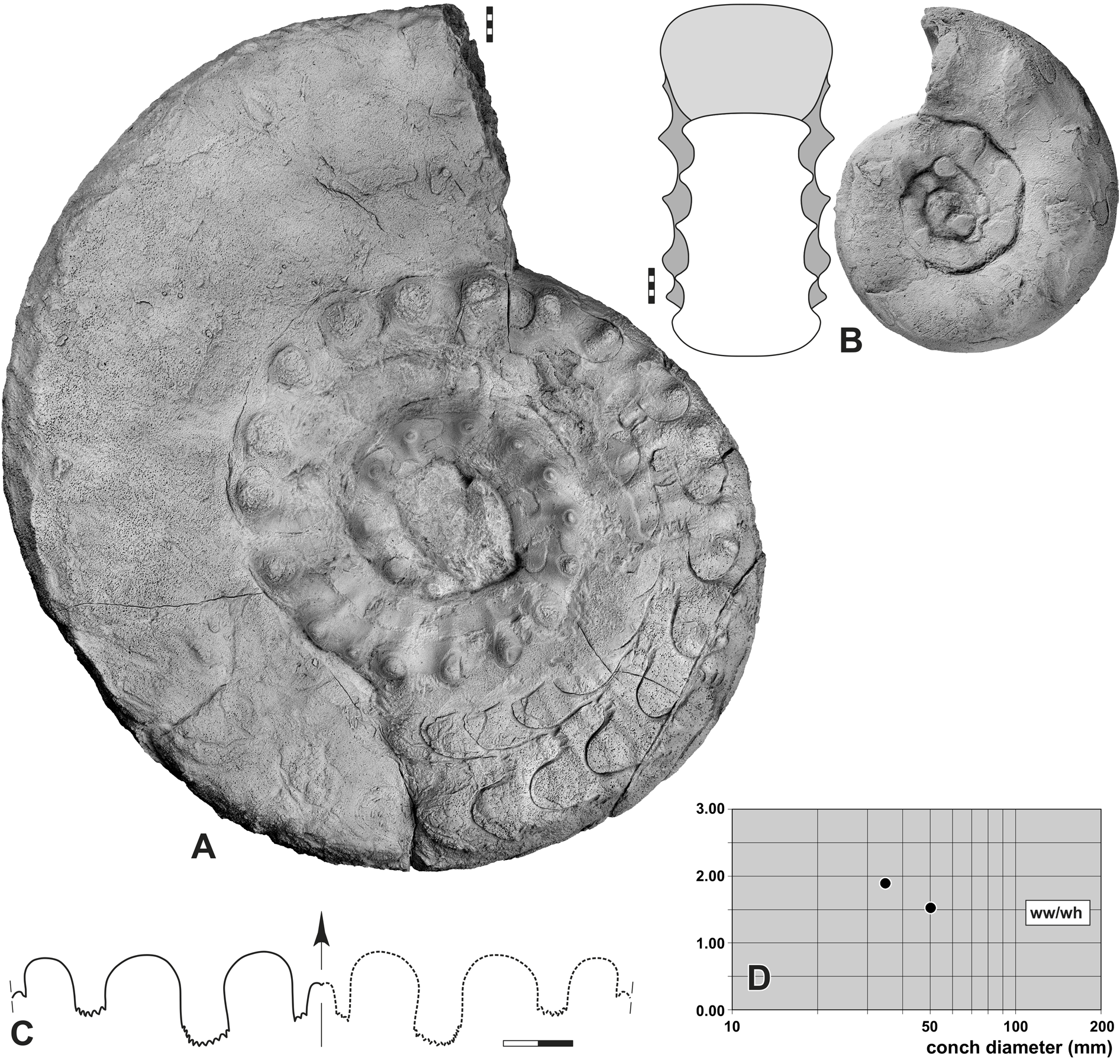

Scientific classification
- Kingdom: Animalia
- Phylum: Mollusca
- Class: Cephalopoda
- Subclass: †Ammonoidea
- Order: †Ceratitida
- Family: †Dzhulfitidae
- Genus: †Dzhulfites; Shevyrev, 1965

= Dzhulfites =

Dzhulfites Temporal range: Upper Permian

Genus of molluscs (fossil)

Dzhulfites is a genus of xenodiscoidean ceratitid ammonoids named by Shevyrev, 1965, for species found in the Upper Permian Julfa Formation of Azerbaijan and type genus for the Dzhulfitidae. The type species, Dzhulfites spinosus Shevyrev 1965 is based on Paratirolites spinosus. Dzhulfites is known from the Permian of Azerbaijan, Iran, and Thailand.

Abachites the now considered close relative is based on Kashmirites stoyanowi from the Upper Permian Bashi Formation also of Azerbaijan.
