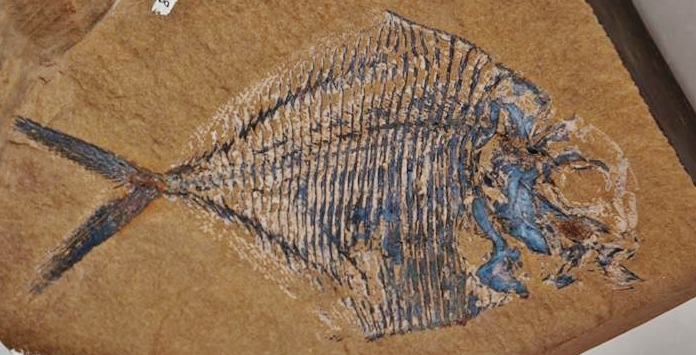
- Bobasatrania canadensis fossil
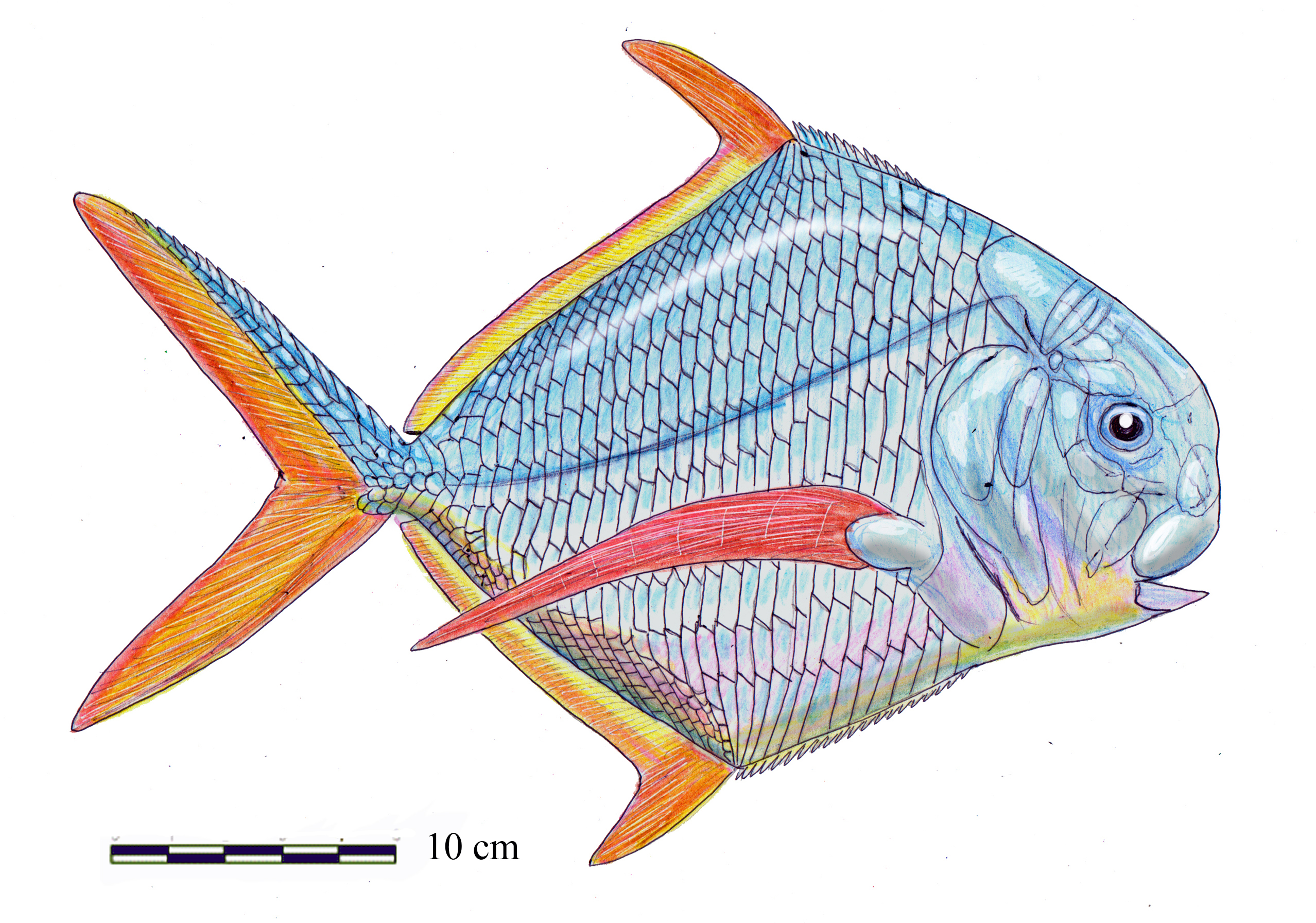
- Bobasatrania canadensis restoration

Scientific classification
- Kingdom: Animalia
- Phylum: Chordata
- Class: Actinopterygii
- Order: †Bobasatraniiformes
- Family: †Bobasatraniidae
- Genus: †Bobasatrania; White, 1932

Type species
- †Bobasatrania mahavavica White, 1932

Species
- See text

Synonyms
- †Haywardia Tanner, 1936; †Lambeichthys Lehman, 1956

= Bobasatrania =

Bobasatrania Temporal range: ~Changhsingian–Ladinian

Extinct genus of fishes

Bobasatrania is an extinct genus of prehistoric marine ray-finned fish that survived the Permian-Triassic extinction event. Fossils of Bobasatrania were found in beds of Changhsingian (late Permian) to Ladinian (Middle Triassic) age. It was most speciose during the Early Triassic.

The genus was named after the locality Bobasatrana (near Ambilobe) in northeast Madagascar, from where the type species, Bobasatrania mahavavica, was described. The name of this species refers to the Mahavavy River.

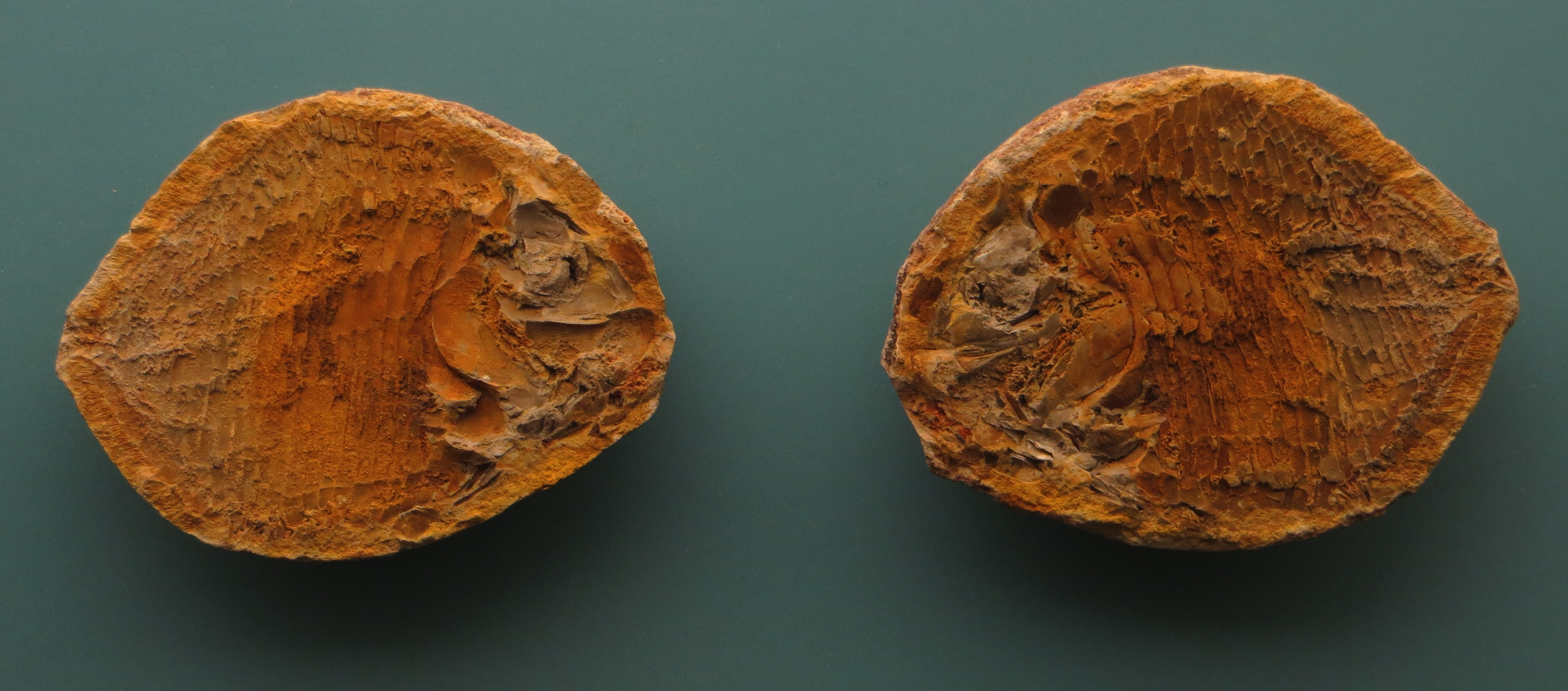
Bobasatrania mahavavica fossil

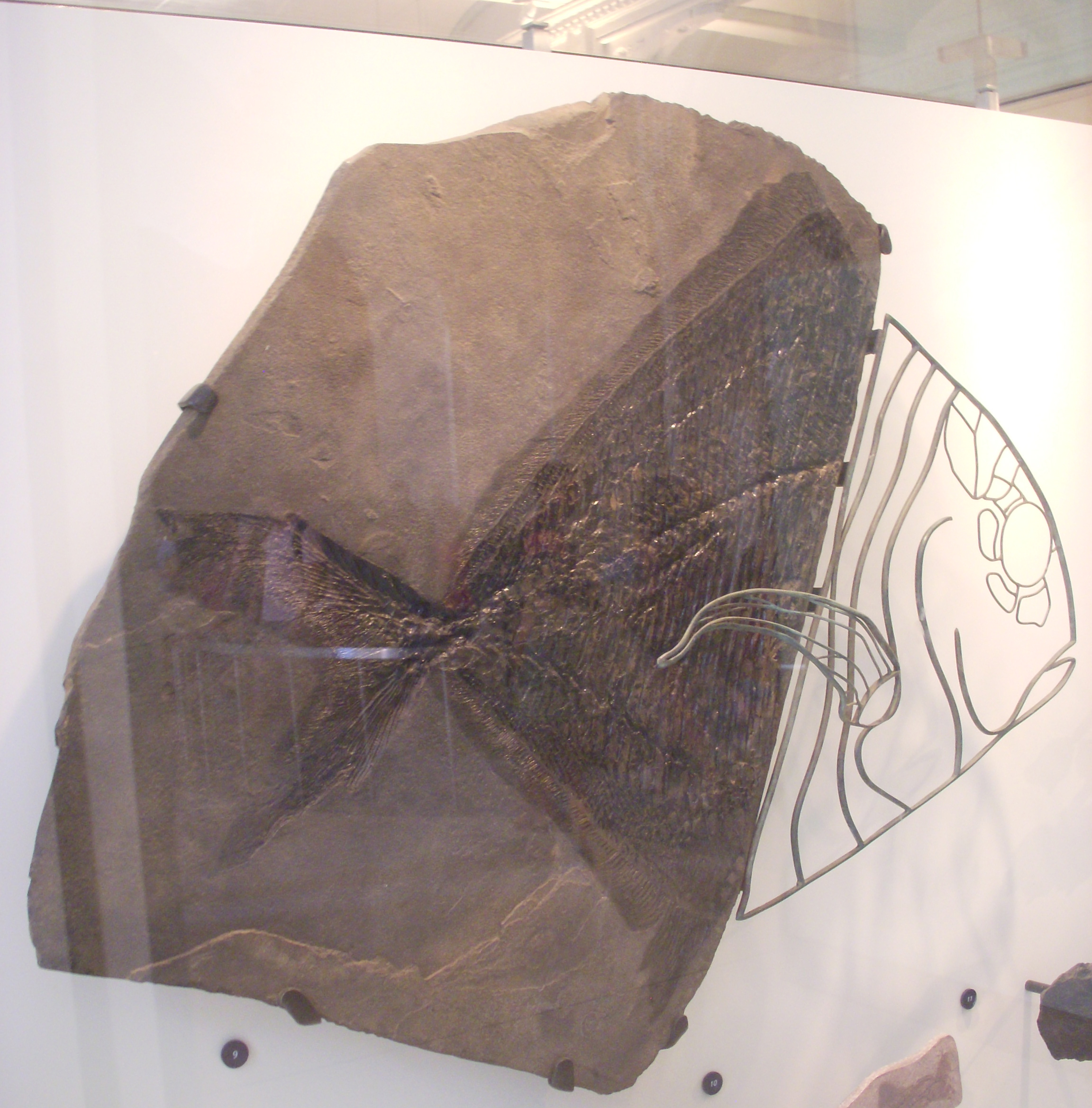
Fossil of Bobasatrania canadensis (AMNH 6210)

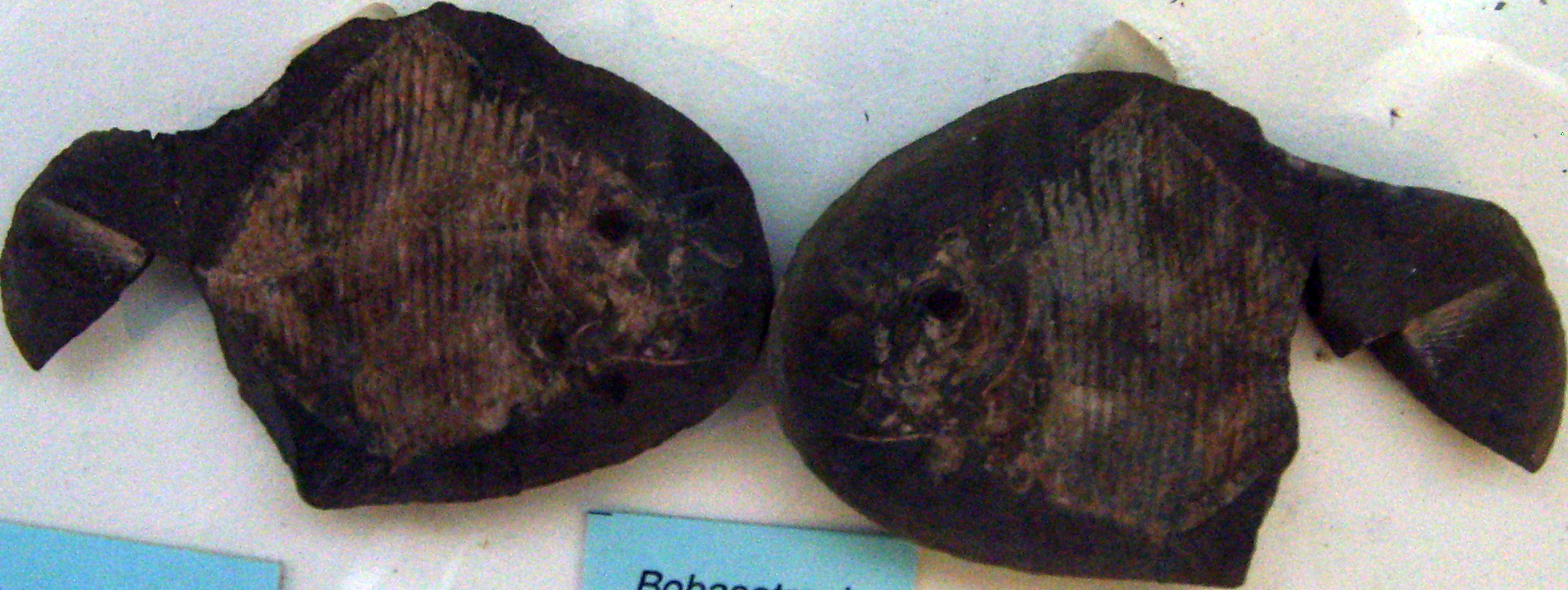
Bobasatrania groenlandica slab and counterslab fossils at the Geological Museum in Copenhagen

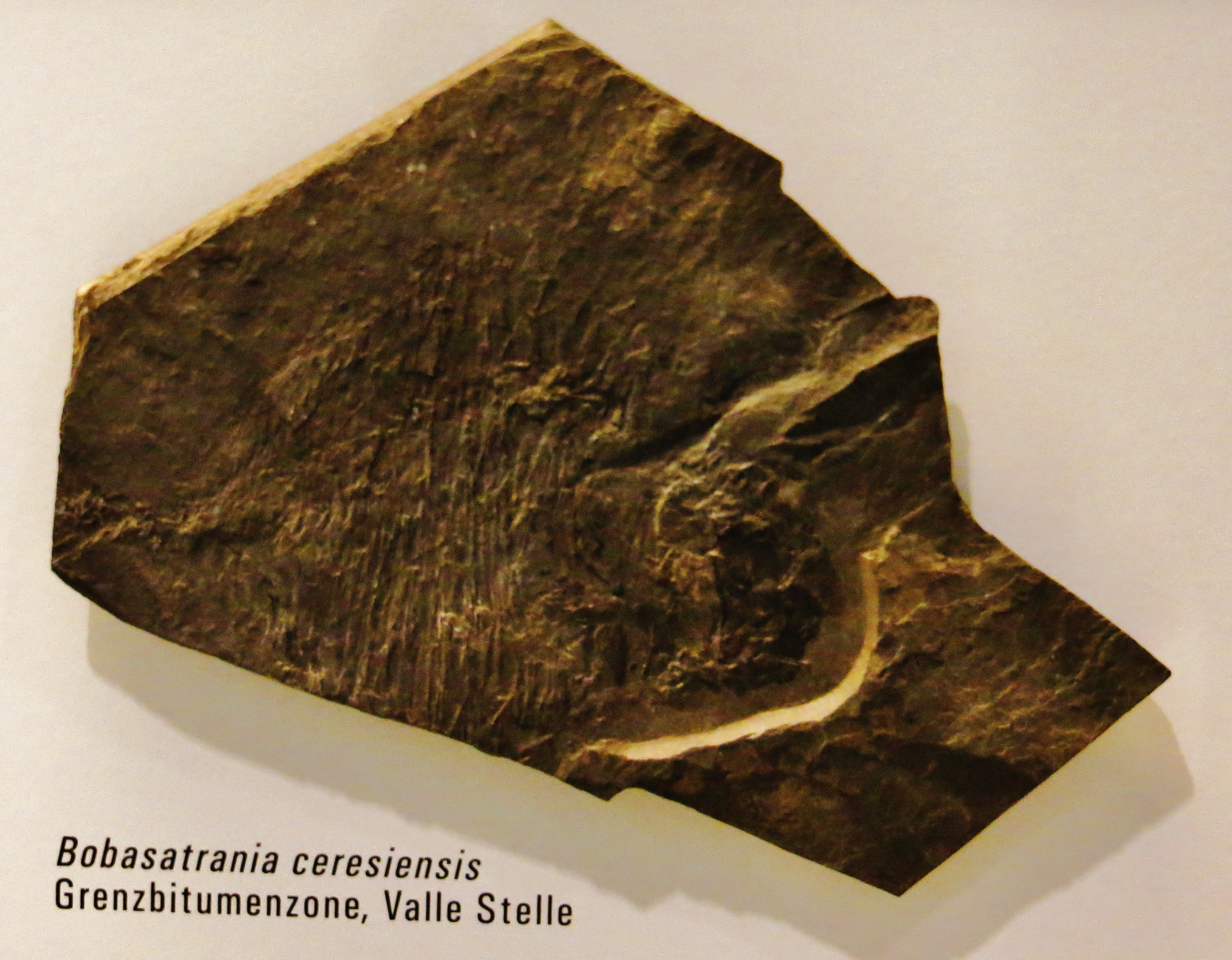
Bobasatrania ceresiensis fossil at Paleontological Museum, University of Zürich

== Taxonomy ==
The following species are known:

- †B. antiqua (Accordi, 1955) - Latest Permian of Italy
- †B. canadensis (Lambe, 1914) - Early Triassic (Olenekian) of British Columbia
- †B. ceresiensis Bürgin, 1992 - Middle Triassic (Ladinian) of Switzerland
- †B. groenlandica Stensiö, 1932 - Earliest Triassic of Greenland
- †B. ladina (Accordi, 1955) - Latest Permian or earliest Triassic of Italy
- †B. mahavica White, 1932 - Early Triassic of Madagascar
- †B. moroderi (Accordi, 1955) - Latest Permian of Italy (possibly conspecific with B. antiqua)
- †B. nathorsti (Stensiö, 1921) - Earliest Triassic of Svalbard
- †B. scutata (Gervais, 1852) - Middle Triassic (late Ladinian) of Germany and France

Remains of indeterminate species are known from the earliest Triassic of both Australia (found via drill core) and the Salt Range of Pakistan, as well as the later Early Triassic of the US states of Nevada and Idaho.

The remains of a "Platysomus"-style tooth plate known from the latest Carboniferous or earliest Permian of the United States appear to be the earliest record of a Bobasatrania relative.

== Occurrence ==
Bobasatrania probably originated during the Lopingian (late Permian) epoch, survived the Permian-Triassic extinction event, and underwent a speciation event during the Triassic in the shallow coastal waters off the Pangaean supercontinent. Their fossils are therefore found across the globe (Canada, France, Germany, Greenland, Italy, Madagascar, Spitsbergen, Pakistan, Switzerland, United States). Some of the best examples are known from the Wapiti Lake region of British Columbia, Canada. The geologically oldest fossils are from the latest Permian Bellerophon Formation of Italy, while the youngest are from the late Ladinian Muschelkalk of Germany and France. Fossils include complete specimens but also isolated, characteristic tooth plates.

== Appearance ==
They have a distinctive diamond-shaped body, forked tail and long thin pectoral fins. B. ceresiensis was about 25 cm (9.8 in) long, while other species, such as B. canadensis, grew to about 1.2 m (3.9 ft) in length or larger. The structure of their teeth (tooth plates) suggests they fed on shelled animals.

== See also ==
- Prehistoric fish
- List of prehistoric bony fish
