= Paraceltitina =

Paraceltitina Temporal range: Middle–Upper Permian

Scientific classification
- Kingdom: Animalia
- Phylum: Mollusca
- Class: Cephalopoda
- Subclass: †Ammonoidea
- Order: †Ceratitida
- Suborder: †Paraceltitina; Shevyrev, 1968

Superfamilies
- Xenodiscoidea

Extinct suborder of molluscs

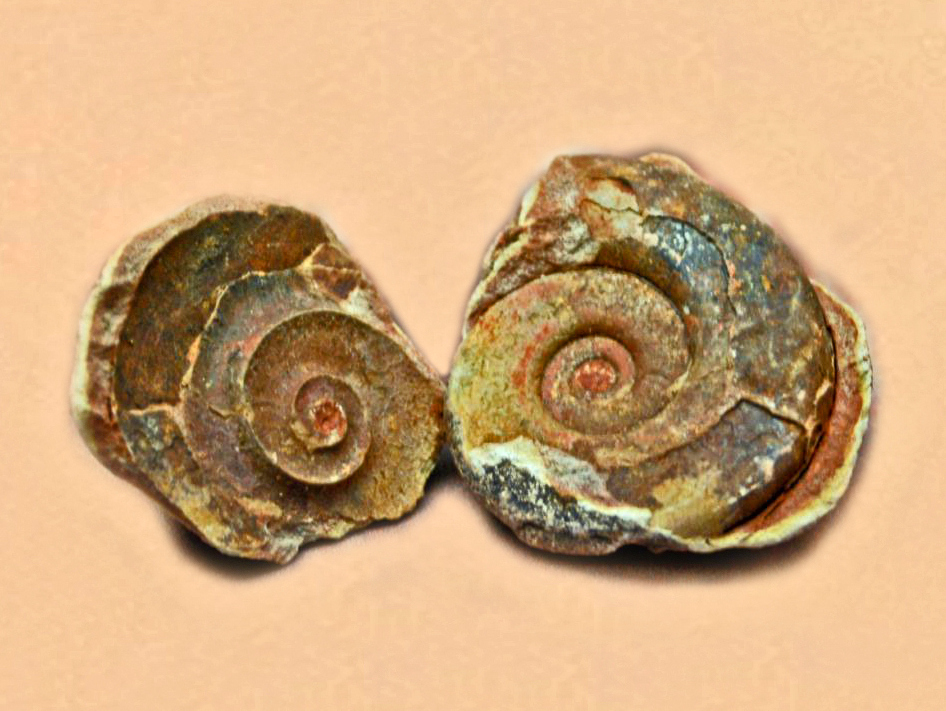

Paraceltitina is a suborder of early, primitive ceratitids (ammonoid cephalopods) from the middle and upper Permian; mostly equivalent to the Xenodiscoidea which it contains. Still used in some classifications but is otherwise disregarded.
