= Boreolepis =

Boreolepis Temporal range: Kungurian to Wuchiapingian

Scientific classification
- Domain: Eukaryota
- Kingdom: Animalia
- Phylum: Chordata
- Class: Actinopterygii
- Family: †Boreolepididae; Aldinger, 1937
- Genus: †Boreolepis; Aldinger, 1937

Type species
- †Boreolepis jenseni Aldinger, 1937

Other species
- †Boreolepis tataricus Esin, 1996

Extinct genus of fishes

Boreolepis is an extinct genus of prehistoric marine ray-finned fish that lived from the Late Kungurian to the Wuchiapingian of the Permian period. It inhabited the high northern latitudes in what is now Greenland and European Russia.

Two species are known:

- Boreolepis jenseni Aldinger, 1937 - Late Cisuralian (Kungurian) to Roadian of Russia, Wuchiapingian of Greenland (Clavering Island)
- Boreolepis tataricus Esin, 1996 - Late Capitanian/Early Wuchiapingian of Russia

== See also ==
- Prehistoric fish
- List of prehistoric bony fish
