= Tapashanitidae =

Tapashanitidae Temporal range: Lopingian

Scientific classification
- Kingdom: Animalia
- Phylum: Mollusca
- Class: Cephalopoda
- Subclass: †Ammonoidea
- Order: †Ceratitida
- Superfamily: †Xenodiscoidea
- Family: †Tapashanitidae; Zhao, 1978

Genera
- Mingyuexiceras; Pseudostephanites; Sinoceltites; Tapashanites

Tapashanitidae is an extinct family of cephalopods belonging to the Ammonite subclass in the order Ceratitida.
