= Pseudotirolitidae =

- Pseudotirolites orientalis, Shanghai Natural History Museum

Scientific classification
- Kingdom: Animalia
- Phylum: Mollusca
- Class: Cephalopoda
- Subclass: †Ammonoidea
- Order: †Ceratitida
- Superfamily: †Xenodiscoidea
- Family: †Pseudotirolitidae; Zhao, 1965

Genera
- Chaotianoceras; Dushanoceras; Pachydiscoceras; Pernodoceras; Pseudotirolites; Schizoloboceras; Trigonogastrites

Extinct family of molluscs

Pseudotirolitidae is an extinct family of cephalopods belonging to the Ammonite subclass in the order Ceratitida.
