= Abichites =

Abichites Temporal range: U Permian

Scientific classification
- Domain: Eukaryota
- Kingdom: Animalia
- Phylum: Mollusca
- Class: Cephalopoda
- Subclass: †Ammonoidea
- Order: †Ceratitida
- Family: †Dzhulfitidae
- Genus: †Abichites; Shevyrev, 1965

Genus of molluscs (fossil)

Abichites is ceratitid genus, assigned to the family Dzhulfitidae, from the Upper Permian of Armenia, Azerbaijan, and Iran, with three species recognized: A. abichi, A. mojsisovicsi, and A. stoyanowi (the type).

Abichites is based on Kashmirites, a genus of the Lower Triassic with a strongly ribbed, commonly tuberculate, evolute shell. included in the Xenoceltitidae (Tozer, 1994). Both genera are included in the superfamily Xenodiscaceae.
