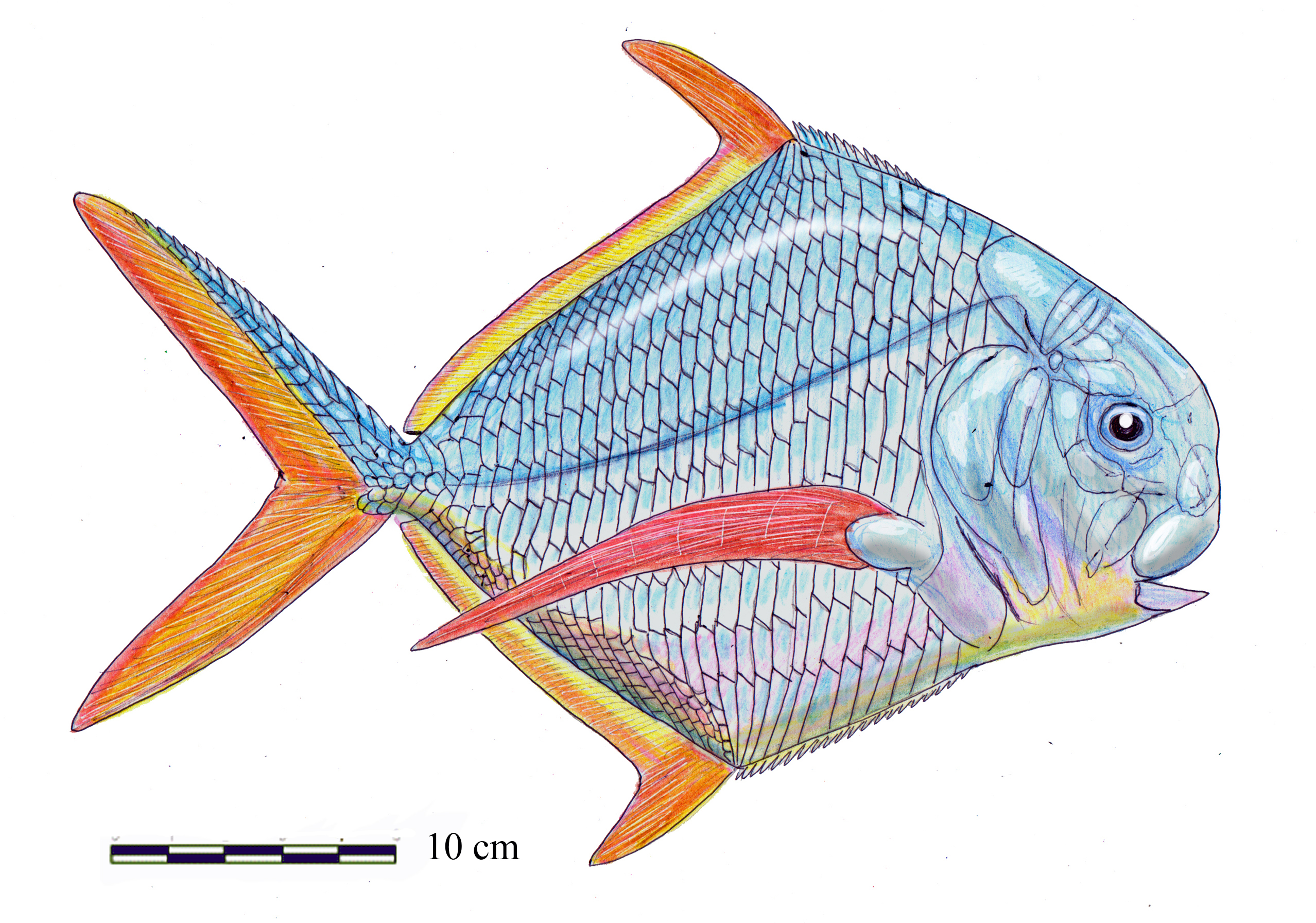
- Restoration of Bobasatrania canadensis

Scientific classification
- Kingdom: Animalia
- Phylum: Chordata
- Class: Actinopterygii
- Order: †Bobasatraniiformes; Berg, 1940

Families
- †Bobasatraniidae Stensiö, 1932; †Dorypteridae Cope, 1877

= Bobasatraniiformes =

Bobasatraniiformes Temporal range: Late Pennsylvanian to Middle Triassic

Extinct order of fishes

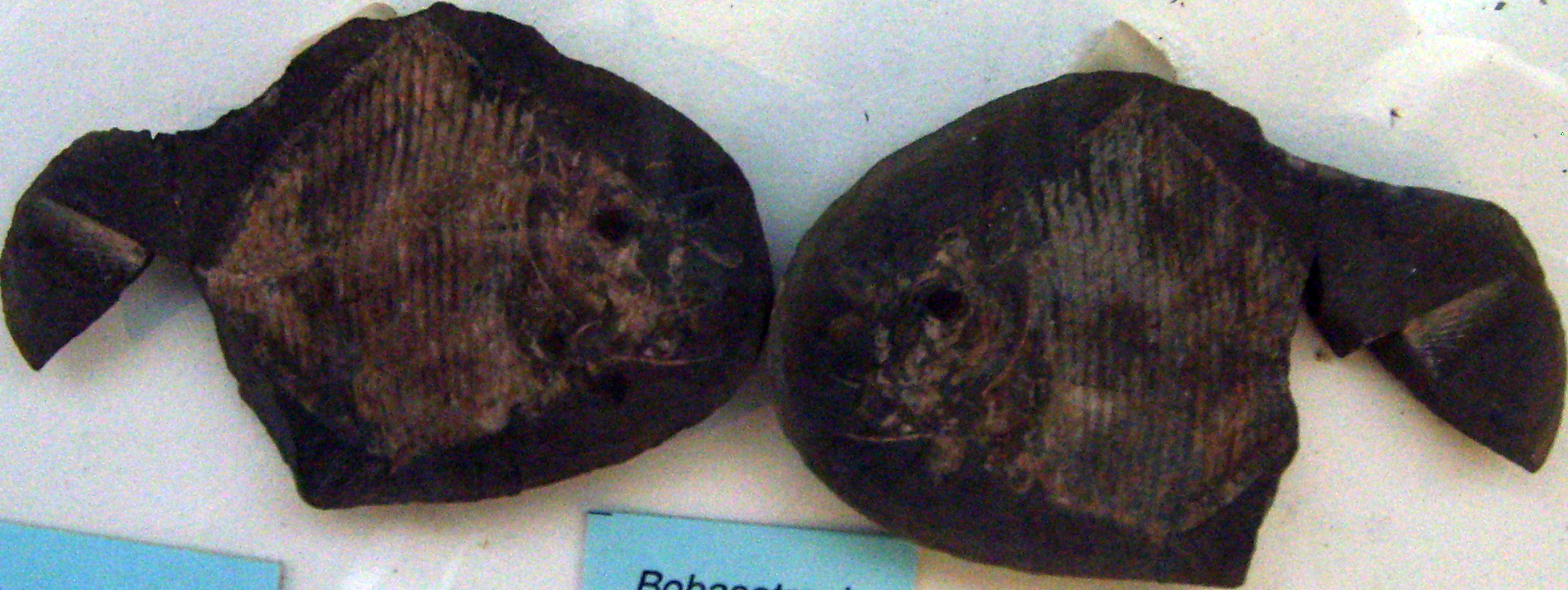
Bobasatrania slab and counterslab fossils

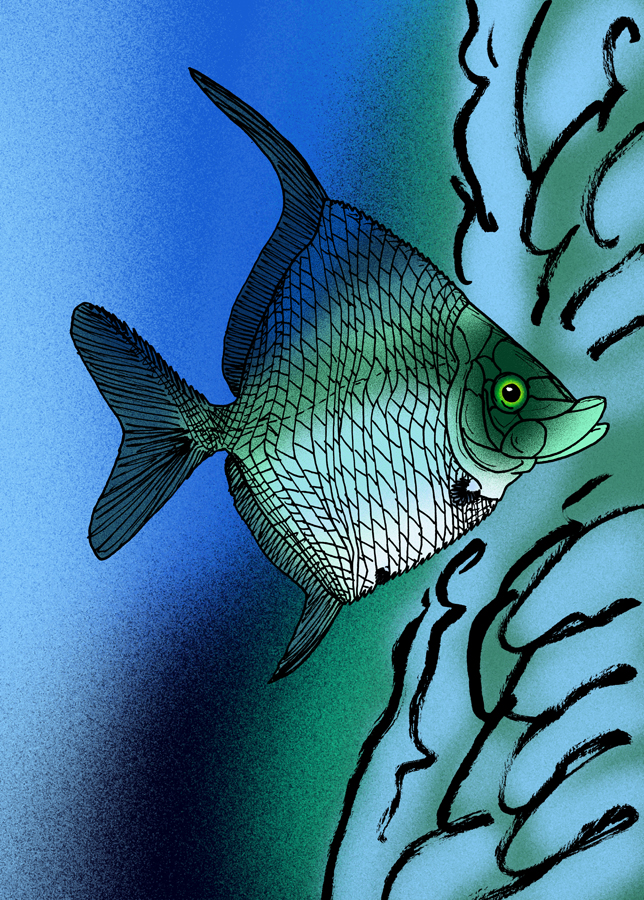
Ebenaqua ritchei lived in Australia during the Permian

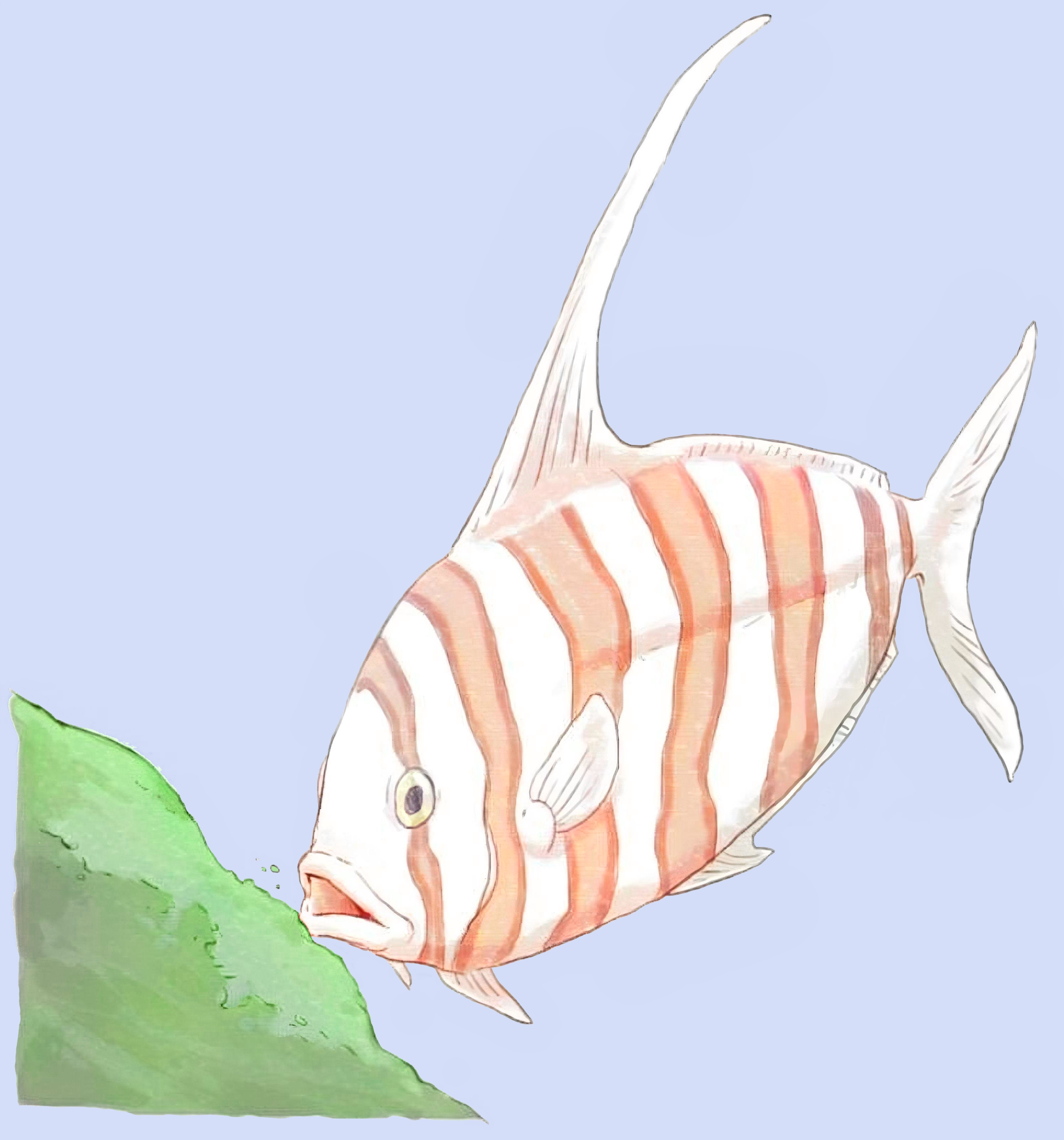
Dorypterus hoffmanni had a high dorsal fin

Bobasatraniiformes is an extinct order of durophagous ray-finned fish that existed from the late Carboniferous to the Middle Triassic in both marine and freshwater environments. The order includes two families: Bobasatraniidae, with the genera Bobasatrania, Ebenaqua, and Ecrinesomus, and Dorypteridae, comprising only the genus Dorypterus (monotypy). Two species from the late Carboniferous previously classified in Platysomus, "Platysomus" schultzei and "Platysomus" swaffordae, are now also thought to be early bobasatraniiformes. Bobasatraniiformes had a somewhat global distribution; fossils are found in Africa (Madagascar), Asia (Pakistan), Australia, Europe, and North America.

Most bobasatraniiforms were small [25 centimetres (9.8 in) or less], but some species of Bobasatrania grew up to 1.2 metres (3.9 ft) long or larger. Bobasatraniiformes have a deepend body, a heterocercal caudal fin, and they often lack pelvic fins (present in Dorypterus, very small in Ebenaqua). Their dorsal and anal fins are often elongate (very elongate dorsal fin in Dorypterus). The body is covered in rhombic scales (scale cover reduced in Dorypterus). Their jaw bones lack teeth. Instead, they possessed strong tooth plates used to crush shelled prey animals similar to modern osteoglossomorphs (Teleostei).

The evolutionary relationships of Bobasatraniiformes with other actinopterygians is not well known, but they are usually placed outside of Neopterygii. A 2025 study found evidence for the order being the sister group to the Guildayichthyiformes from the Carboniferous, with their clade occupying an early-diverging position within the actinopterygian crown group.

Bobasatraniiformes are one of the groups that survived the Permian-Triassic extinction event.

== Systematics ==
- Order †Bobasatraniiformes Berg, 1940
  - "Platysomus" schultzei Zidek, 1992
  - "Platysomus" swaffordae Mickle & Bader, 2009
  - Family †Bobasatraniidae Stensiö, 1932
    - Genus †Bobasatrania White, 1932 [†Haywardia Tanner, 1936; †Lambeichthys Lehman, 1956]
      - †Bobasatrania antiqua (Accordi, 1955) [†Paralepidotus antiquus Accordi, 1955; †Paralepidotus moroderi Accordi, 1955]
      - †Bobasatrania canadensis (Lambe, 1914) [†Platysomus canadensis Lambe, 1914; †Platysomus brewsteri Warren, 1936; †Haywardia jordani Tanner, 1936; †Lambeichthys canadensis Lehman, 1956]
      - †Bobasatrania ceresiensis Bürgin, 1992
      - †Bobasatrania groenlandica Stensiö, 1932
      - †Bobasatrania ladina (Accordi, 1955) [†Paralepidotus ladinus Accordi, 1955]
      - †Bobasatrania mahavavica White, 1932 (type species)
      - †Bobasatrania nathorsti (Stensiö, 1921) [†Platysomus nathorsti Stensiö, 1921]
      - †Bobasatrania scutata (Gervais, 1852) [†Colobodus scutatus Gervais, 1852]
    - Genus †Ebenaqua Campbell & Phuoc, 1983
      - †Ebenaqua ritchiei Campbell & Phuoc, 1983 (type species)
    - Genus †Ecrinesomus Woodward, 1910
      - †Ecrinesomus dixoni Woodward, 1910 (type species)
    - †Tatarstanichthys Taverne & Capasso, 2026
      - †Tatarstanichthys bannikovi Taverne & Capasso, 2026 (type species)
  - Family †Dorypteridae Cope, 1877
    - Genus †Dorypterus Germar, 1842
      - †Dorypterus hoffmanni Germar, 1842 (type species)
      - †Dorypterus althausi (Münster, 1842)

== Additional sources ==
- Sepkoski, Jack (2002). "A compendium of fossil marine animal genera". Bulletins of American Paleontology. 364: 560. Archived from the original on 2009-02-20.
