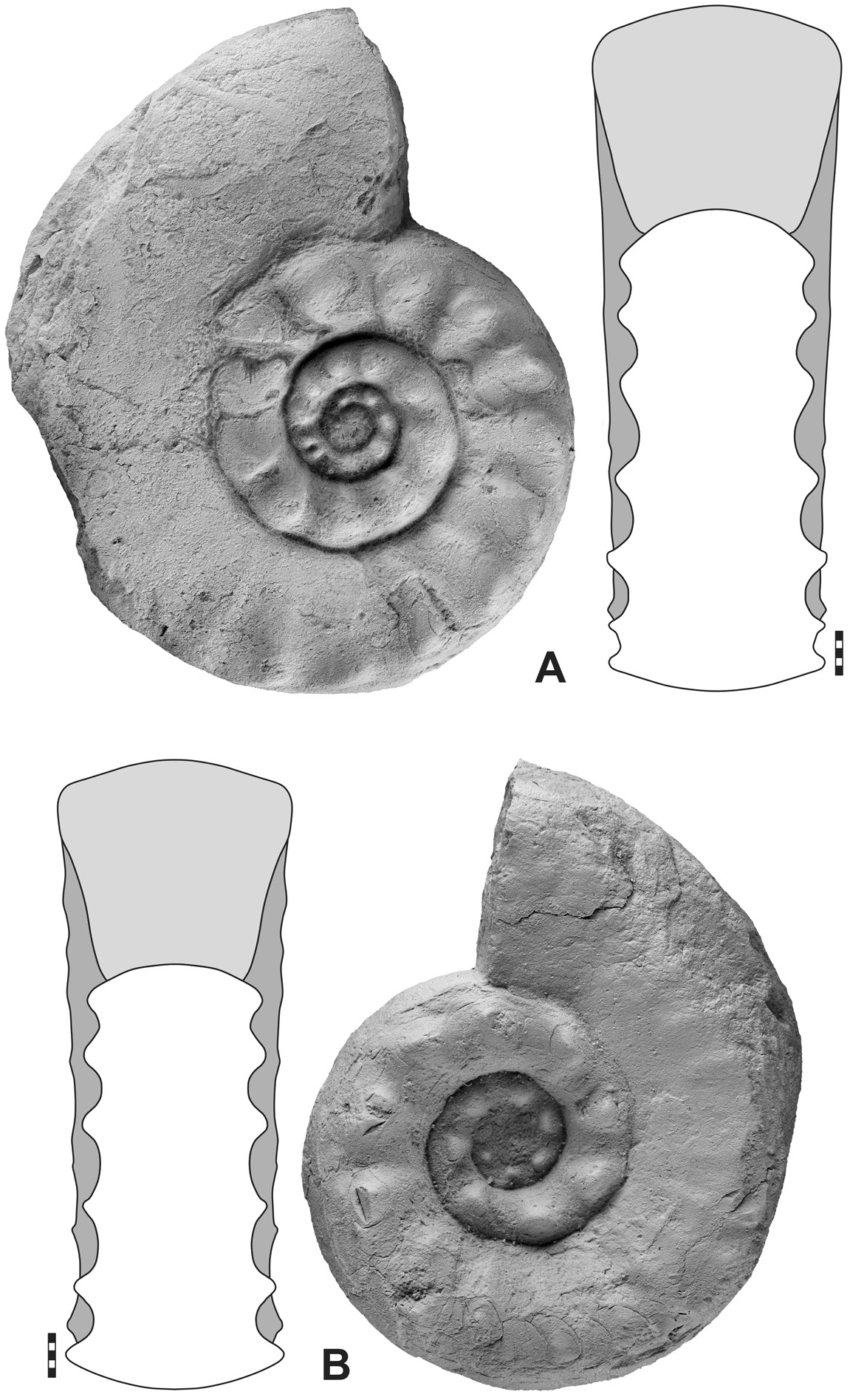

Scientific classification
- Domain: Eukaryota
- Kingdom: Animalia
- Phylum: Mollusca
- Class: Cephalopoda
- Subclass: †Ammonoidea
- Order: †Ceratitida
- Family: †Dzhulfitidae
- Genus: †Paratirolites; Stoyanow, 1910

= Paratirolites =

Paratirolites Temporal range: Upper Permian–Lower Triassic

Genus of molluscs (fossil)

Paratirolites is a genus of latest Permian and earliest Triassic ceratites from Armenia, Azerbaijan, Afghanistan, China and Iran with distinct ribs, prominent ventro-lateral tubercles, and a broadly arched venter. The suture is ceratitic with a large ventral saddle. Ceratites are ammonoid cephalopods that lived during the Late Permian and Triassic.

Paratirolites is included in the Xenodiscoidean family Dzhulfitidae along with Abichites and Dzhulfites. Previously it was included in the Stephanitidae, a family belonging to the Ceratitoidea.

Species of Paratirolites have also been found in the Upper Permian of Azerbaijan, China, Thailand and Japan, and in the Triassic of Azerbaijan and Afghanistan.
