= Shevyryov =

Surname list

Shevyryov or Shevyrev are the surname of the following people

- Pyotr Yakovlevich Shevyryov (1863–1887), Russian revolutionary
- Stepan Shevyryov (1806–1864), Russian historian and poet
- Valeri Shevyryov (born in 1974), Russian footballer
