= Wuchiapingian =

Eighth stage of the Permian

- 259.51 ± 0.21 – 254.14 ± 0.07 Ma
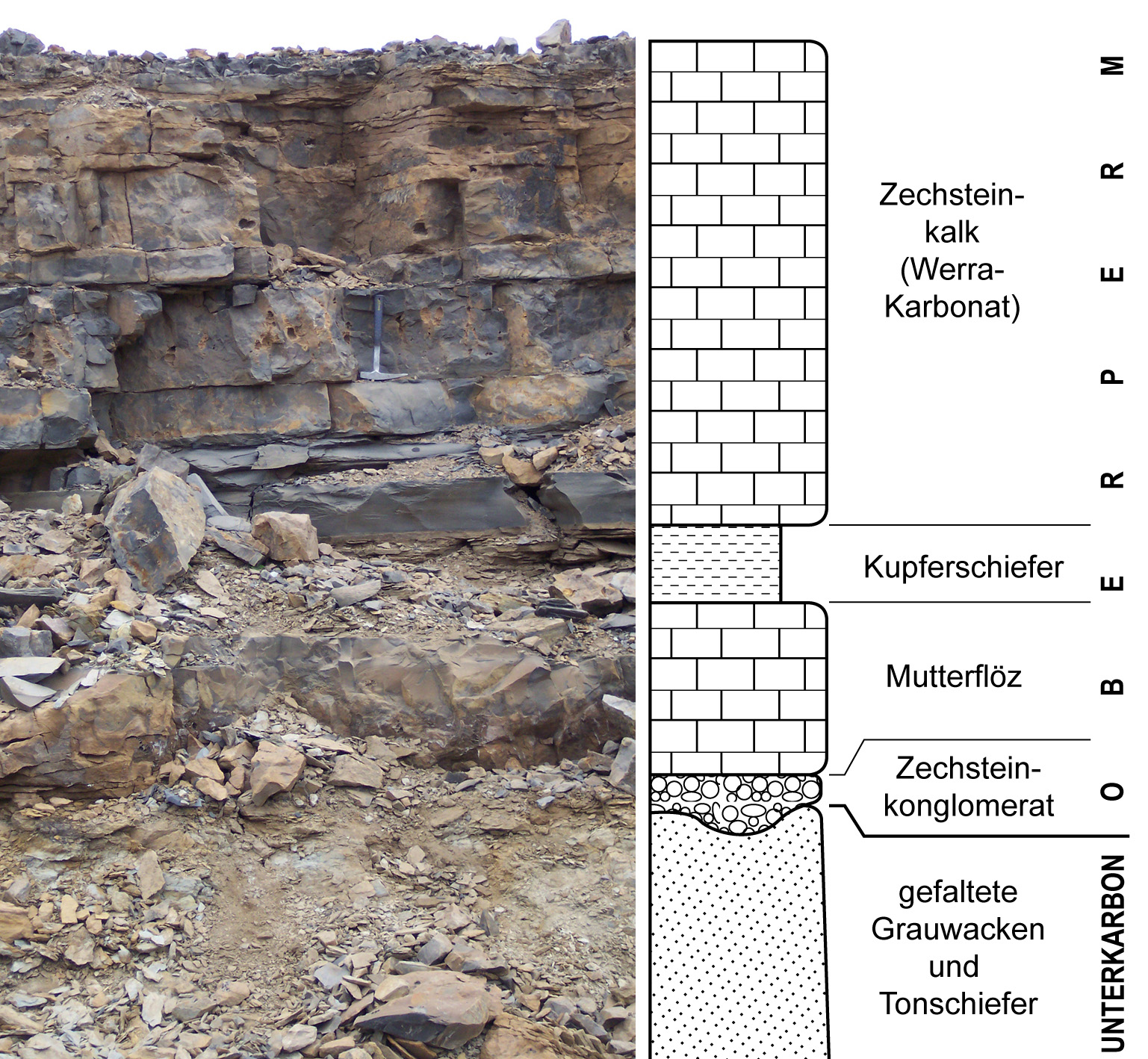
- Wuchiapingian aged stratigraphic succession including the Kupferschiefer, Kamsdorf mine near Saalfeld, Thuringia, Germany

Chronology
| ← / Permian-Triassic mass extinction event; ← / end-Capitanian extinction event; ← / Olson's Extinction |
Subdivision of the Permian according to the ICS, as of 2023. Vertical axis scale: Millions of years ago

Etymology
- Name formality: Formal

Usage information
- Celestial body: Earth
- Regional usage: Global (ICS)
- Time scale(s) used: ICS Time Scale

Definition
- Chronological unit: Age
- Stratigraphic unit: Stage
- Time span formality: Formal
- Lower boundary definition: FAD of the Conodont Clarkina postbitteri postbitteri
- Lower boundary GSSP: Penglaitan Section, Laibin, Guangxi, China; 23.6953°N 109.3211°E
- Lower GSSP ratified: 2004
- Upper boundary definition: Meishan, Zhejiang, China
- Upper boundary GSSP: FAD of the Conodont Clarkina wangi 31.0819°N 119.7064°E
- Upper GSSP ratified: 2005

In the geologic timescale, the Wuchiapingian or Wujiapingian (from Chinese: 吴家坪; pinyin: Wújiāpíng; lit. 'Wu Family Flatland' in the Liangshan area of Hanzhong, Shaanxi Province 33.0664°N 107.0232°E) is an age or stage of the Permian. It is also the lower or earlier of two subdivisions of the Lopingian Epoch or Series. The Wuchiapingian spans the time between 259.51 and 254.14 million years ago (Ma). It was preceded by the Capitanian and followed by the Changhsingian.

Regional stages with which the Wuchiapingian is coeval or overlaps include the Djulfian or Dzhulfian, Longtanian, Rustlerian, Saladoan, and Castilian.

== Stratigraphic definitions ==
The Wuchiapingian was first used in 1962, when the Lopingian Series of southwestern China was divided in the Changhsingian and Wuchiapingian Formations. In 1973 the Wuchiapingian was first used as a chronostratigraphic unit (i.e. a stage, as opposed to a formation, which is a lithostratigraphic unit).

The base of the Wuchiapingian Stage is defined as the place in the stratigraphic record where the conodont species Clarkina postbitteri postbitteri first appears. A global reference profile for this boundary (a GSSP) is located near Laibin in the Chinese province of Guangxi.

The top of the Wuchiapingian (the base of the Changhsingian) is at the first appearance of conodont species Clarkina wangi.

The Wuchiapingian contains two ammonoid biozones: that of the genus Araxoceras and that of the genera Roadoceras and Doulingoceras.

== Wuchiapingian life ==
An extinction pulse occurred during the Wuchiapingian; faunas were recovering when another larger extinction pulse, the Permian–Triassic extinction event devastated life.

A relatively diverse fish fauna is known from the coeval Kupferschiefer (Werra Formation, Germany), Marl Slate Formation (England) and Ravnefjeld Formation (Greenland), including, among others, the following genera: Acentrophorus, Acropholis, Boreolepis, Coelacanthus, Dorypterus, Janassa, Menaspis, Palaeoniscum, Platysomus, Pygopterus and Wodnika. The Hambast Formation of Iran yielded chondrichthyan faunas of Wuchiapingian to Changhsingian age. The Wuchiapingian layers produced teeth of the eugeneodontid Bobbodus.

== Notable formations ==
- Hambast Formation (Iran)
- Marl Slate Formation (England)
- Naobaogou Formation (Inner Mongolia, China)
- Ravnefjeld Formation (Greenland)
- Sunjiagou Formation (Shanxi, China)
- Tropidostoma Assemblage Zone* (South Africa)
- Werra Formation (Kupferschiefer, Germany)
