= Clarkina =

Clarkina Temporal range: Permian

Scientific classification
- Kingdom: Animalia
- Phylum: Chordata
- Infraphylum: Agnatha
- Class: †Conodonta
- Order: †Ozarkodinida
- Family: †Gondolellidae
- Genus: †Clarkina; Kozur 1990

Species
- †Clarkina changxingensis; †Clarkina crofti Kozur & Lucas; †Clarkina deflecta; †Clarkina leveni; †Clarkina orientalis; †Clarkina postbitteri; †Clarkina postbitteri hongshuiensis; †Clarkina postbitteri postbitteri; †Clarkina wangi; †Clarkina subcarinata

Synonyms
- ?Neogondolella

Genus of fishes (fossil)

Clarkina is an extinct genus of conodonts. It is considered to be an offshore, outer shelf or basinal, deep-water taxon.

The genus name is a tribute to David Leigh Clark.

== Synonyms ==
Clarkina Soodan 1975 is a junior synonym for the prehistoric sea cucumber Soodanella Huddleston 1982 in the family Priscopedatidae.

Clarkina Jordan & Evermann, 1927 is a junior synonym for the cyprinid fish genus Mylocheilus Agassiz, 1855.

== Use in stratigraphy ==
The top of the Capitanian (or the base of the Wuchiapingian) is defined as the place in the stratigraphic record where the conodont subspecies Clarkina postbitteri postbitteri first appears.

The top of the Wuchiapingian (or the base of the Changhsingian) is defined as the place in the stratigraphic record where the conodont species Clarkina wangi first appears. The global reference section is profile D at Meishan, in the type area in Changxing.
