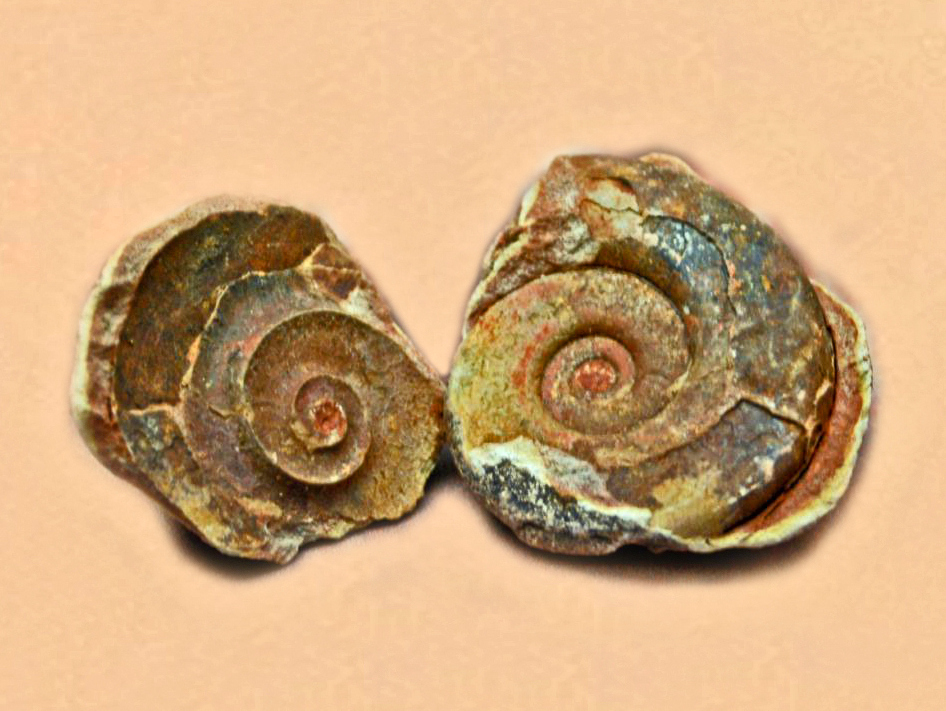
- Xenodiscus besairiei on display at the Museo Civico di Storia Naturale di Milano

Scientific classification
- Domain: Eukaryota
- Kingdom: Animalia
- Phylum: Mollusca
- Class: Cephalopoda
- Subclass: †Ammonoidea
- Order: †Ceratitida
- Suborder: †Paraceltitina
- Superfamily: †Xenodiscoidea

Families
- Dzhulfitidae; Huananoceratidae; Liuchengoceratidae; Melagathiceratidae; Paraceltitidae; Pleuronodoceratidae; Pseudotirolitidae; Tapashanitidae; Xenoceltitidae; Xenodiscidae

= Xenodiscoidea =

Xenodiscoidea Temporal range: Guadalupian–Early Triassic

Superfamily of molluscs (fossil)

Xenodiscoidea, formerly Xenodiscaceae, is a superfamily within the ammonoid order Ceratitida. The superfamily was named by Frech in 1902, presently contains ten families, only one of which was included in the original Otocerataceae of Hyatt, 1900, the remaining having been added.

The Xenodiscoidea has its origins in the Middle Permian in the prolecanitid Daraelitidae through the ancestral Xenodiscidae. According to Kummel (1952) and Arkell et al. (1957) the Xenodiscidae gave rise to the Otoceratidae and Ophiceratidae. The Ophiceratidae in turn gave rise to the Dieneroceratidae which is considered the source for all remaining ceratitid stocks. All four families made up the original Otocerataceae

The Xenodiscidae is removed from the Otocerataceae as originally perceived (Arkell et al. 1957) to become the root of Xenodiscoidea, as emended. The Otoceratidae remains the type family of the Otocerataceae as revised. The Ophiceratidae is reassigned to the Noritaceae along with the Dieneroceratidae.

The Huananoceratidae, Liuchengoeratidae, Plueronodoceratidae, and Tapshanitidae, described by Zhao et al. 1978, include Late Permian and Early Triassic genera from Asia. The Xenoceltitidae, established by Spath in 1930 are included in the Treatise in the superfamily Noritaceae

The Xenodiscoidea gave rise through the Ophiceratidae to the Noritaceae. and through the Paraceltitidae to the revised Otocerataceae
