= Lopingian =

Third and final series of the Permian

- 259.51 ± 0.21 – 251.902 ± 0.024 Ma
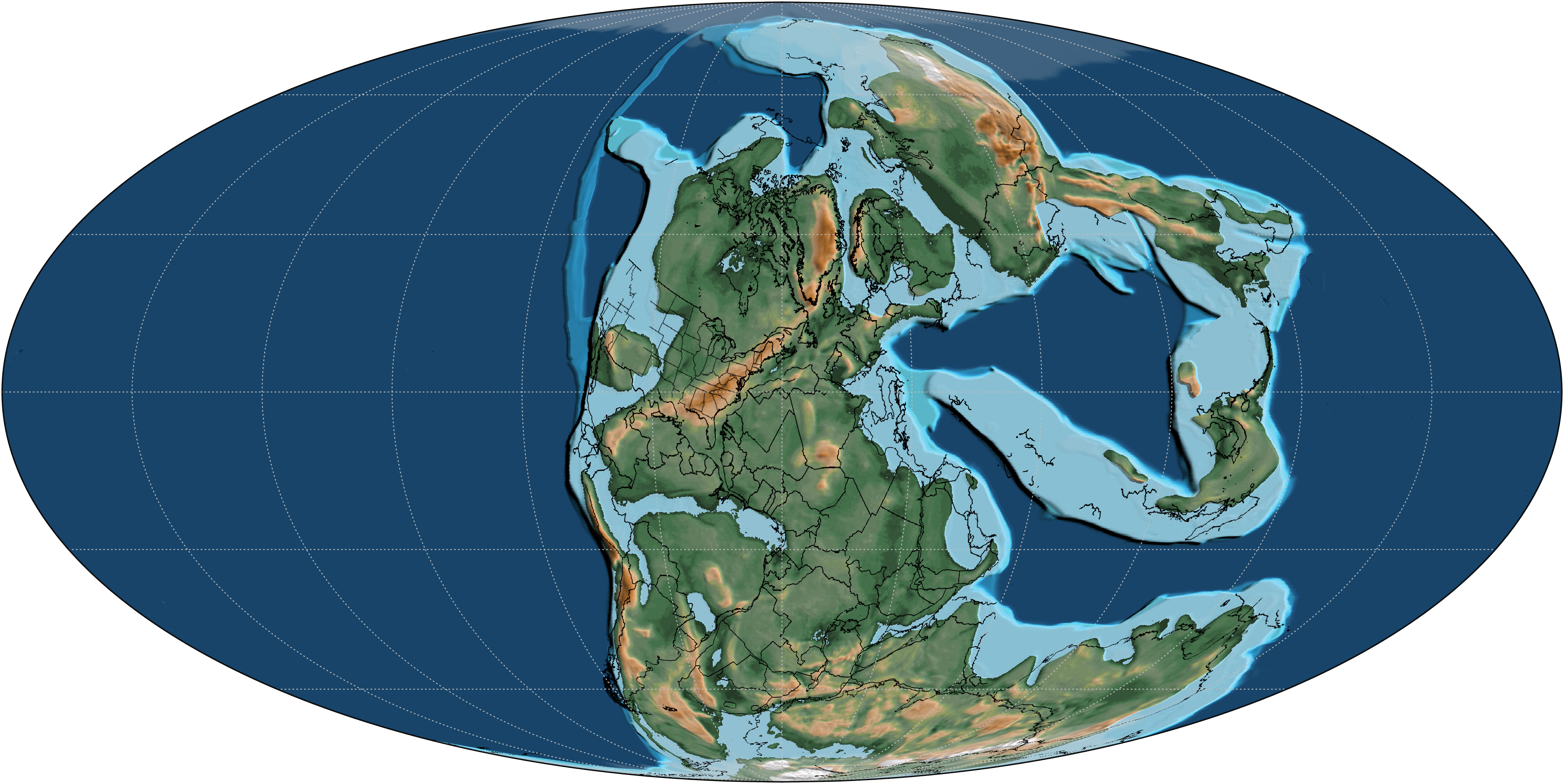
- A map of Earth as it appeared 255 million years ago during the Lopingian Epoch, Wuchiapingian Age

Chronology
← / Permian-Triassic mass extinction event; ← / end-Capitanian extinction event; ← / Olson's Extinction
Subdivision of the Permian according to the ICS, as of 2023. Vertical axis scale: Millions of years ago

Etymology
- Name formality: Formal
- Synonym(s): Late/Upper Permian

Usage information
- Celestial body: Earth
- Regional usage: Global (ICS)
- Time scale(s) used: ICS Time Scale

Definition
- Chronological unit: Epoch
- Stratigraphic unit: Series
- Time span formality: Formal
- Lower boundary definition: FAD of the Conodont Clarkina postbitteri postbitteri
- Lower boundary GSSP: Penglaitan Section, Laibin, Guangxi, China; 23.6953°N 109.3211°E
- Lower GSSP ratified: 2004
- Upper boundary definition: FAD of the Conodont Hindeodus parvus.
- Upper boundary GSSP: Meishan, Zhejiang, China; 31.0798°N 119.7058°E
- Upper GSSP ratified: 2001

The Lopingian, informally the Late or Upper Permian, is the uppermost series/last epoch of the Permian, and last epoch of the Paleozoic. The Lopingian was preceded by the Guadalupian and followed by the Early Triassic.

The name was introduced by Amadeus William Grabau in 1931 and derives from Leping, Jiangxi in China. It consists of two stages/ages. The earlier is the Wuchiapingian and the later is the Changhsingian.

The International Chronostratigraphic Chart (v2018/07) provides a numerical age of 259.1 ±0.5 Ma. If a Global Boundary Stratotype Section and Point (GSSP) has been approved, the lower boundary of the earliest stage determines numerical age of an epoch. The GSSP for the Wuchiapingian has a numerical age of 259.8 ± 0.4 Ma.

Evidence from Milankovitch cycles suggests that the length of an Earth day during this epoch was approximately 22 hours.

== Geography ==
During the Lopingian, most of the earth was in the supercontinent Pangaea. The Zechstein sea, would, at times, be connected to the Paleo-Tethys Ocean. Other features of the earth during the time were the microcontinent Cathaysia and the Cimmerian superterrane, which divided the Tethys Ocean realm into the Paleo-Tethys Ocean and the slowly expanding Neotethys (or Tethys) Ocean.

== Life ==
The Lopingian ended with the Permian–Triassic extinction event, where over 95% of species went extinct.

The series follows the Guadalupian, which ended with the Capitanian mass extinction, during which many species of brachiopods, ammonoids and other groups went extinct.

Conodonts would reach their all-time low during this period. Despite this, they are recovered from most marine Permian localities. Common conodonts from the Lopingian include the genera Clarkina and Hindeodus.

The Lopingian would see the decline of the Paleozoic ammonoid orders (Goniatitida and Prolecanitida) and the rise of the order Ceratitida, especially within the superfamily Xenodiscoidea.

Only seven trilobites are known from the Lopingian, with only five by the end of the epoch. One of the last members of this clade was Kathwaia capitorosa.

Eurypterids were nearly extinct by this point, consisting of the possibly Lopingian Campylocephalus permicus of Russia; and the Changhsingian Woodwardopterus? freemanorum of Australia.

A member of the extant horseshoe crab family, Limulidae; Guangyuanolimulus appears at the end of the period.

On land, gorgonopsians would become the apex predators after the extinction of the dinocephalians. Other predators included the therocephalians. Herbivorous animals of the Lopingian include the pareiasaurs such as Scutosaurus and dicynodonts such as Dicynodon.

=== Fossil gallery ===
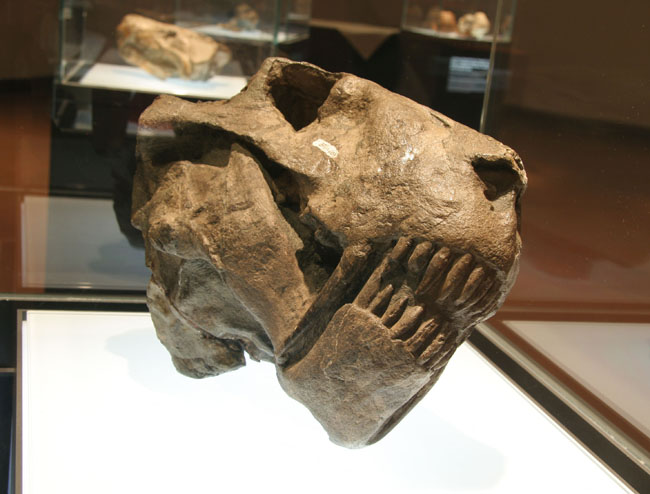
Smilesaurus ferox, one of the most fearsome predators of the Lopingian

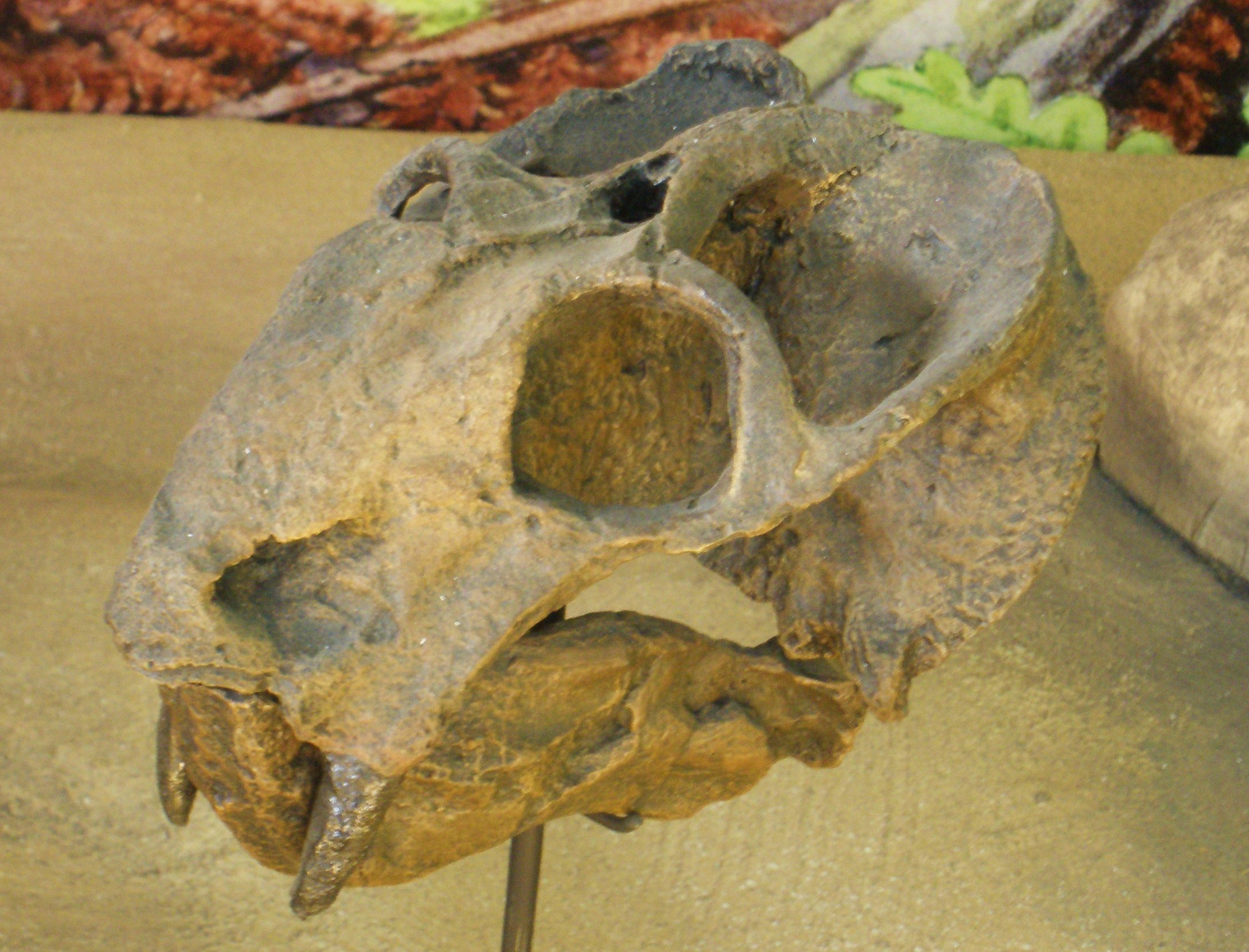
Skull of Dicynodon, a dicynodont.

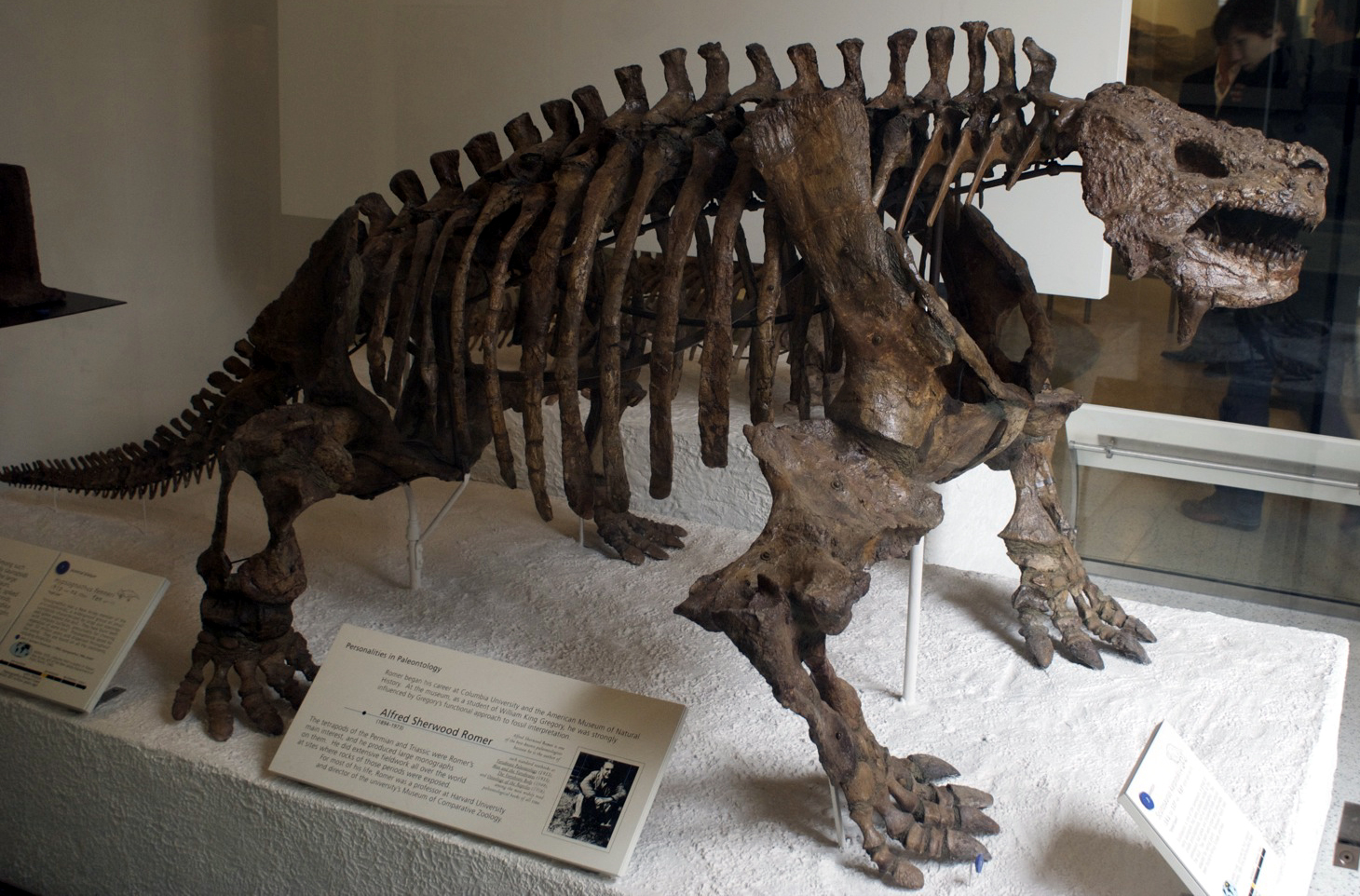
Scutosaurus, a common herbivore during the late Permian

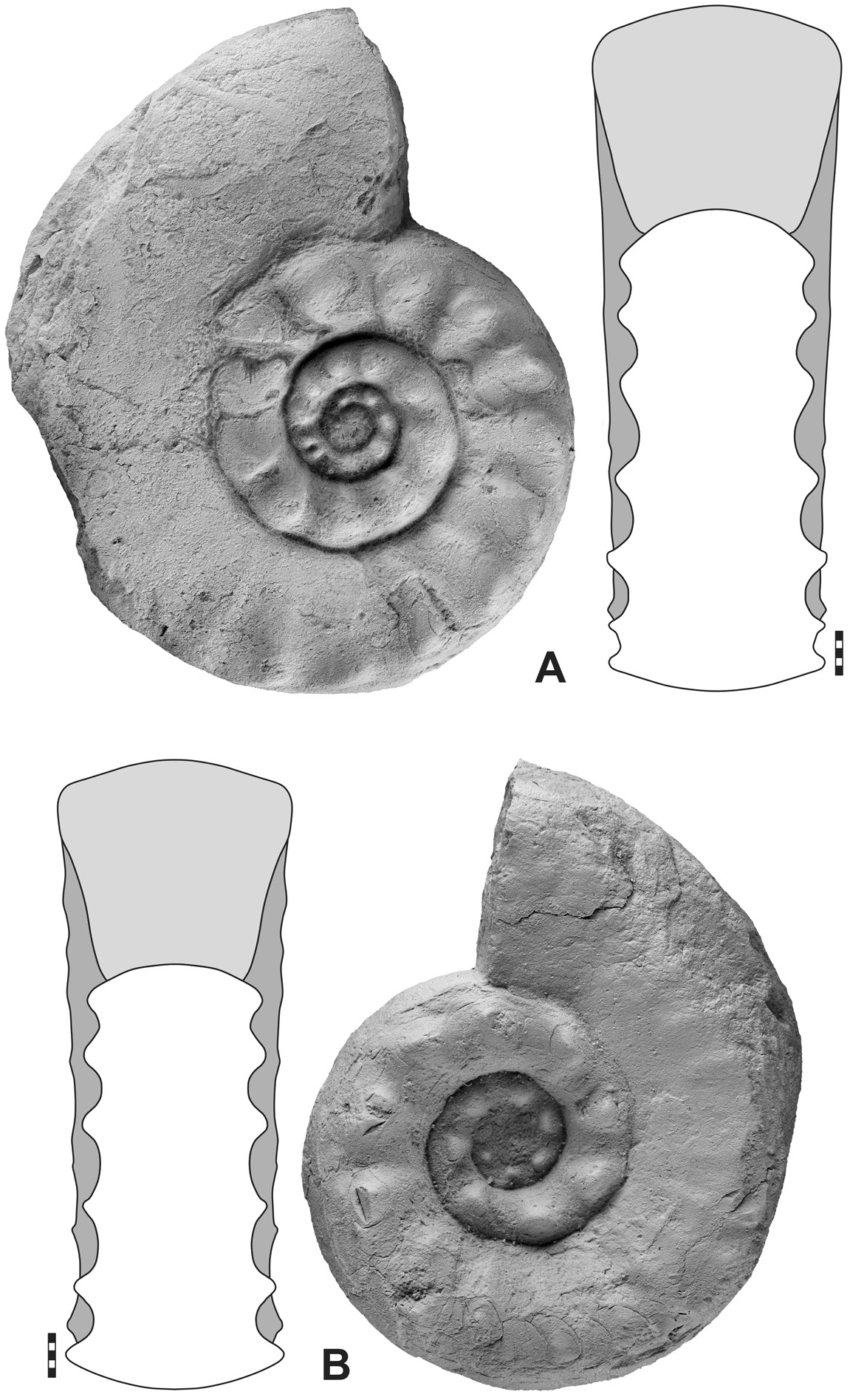
Paratirolites, an ammonoid from the latest Permian (Changhsingian)

== See also ==
- Geologic time scale – System that relates geologic strata to time
- Cisuralian – First series of the Permian
