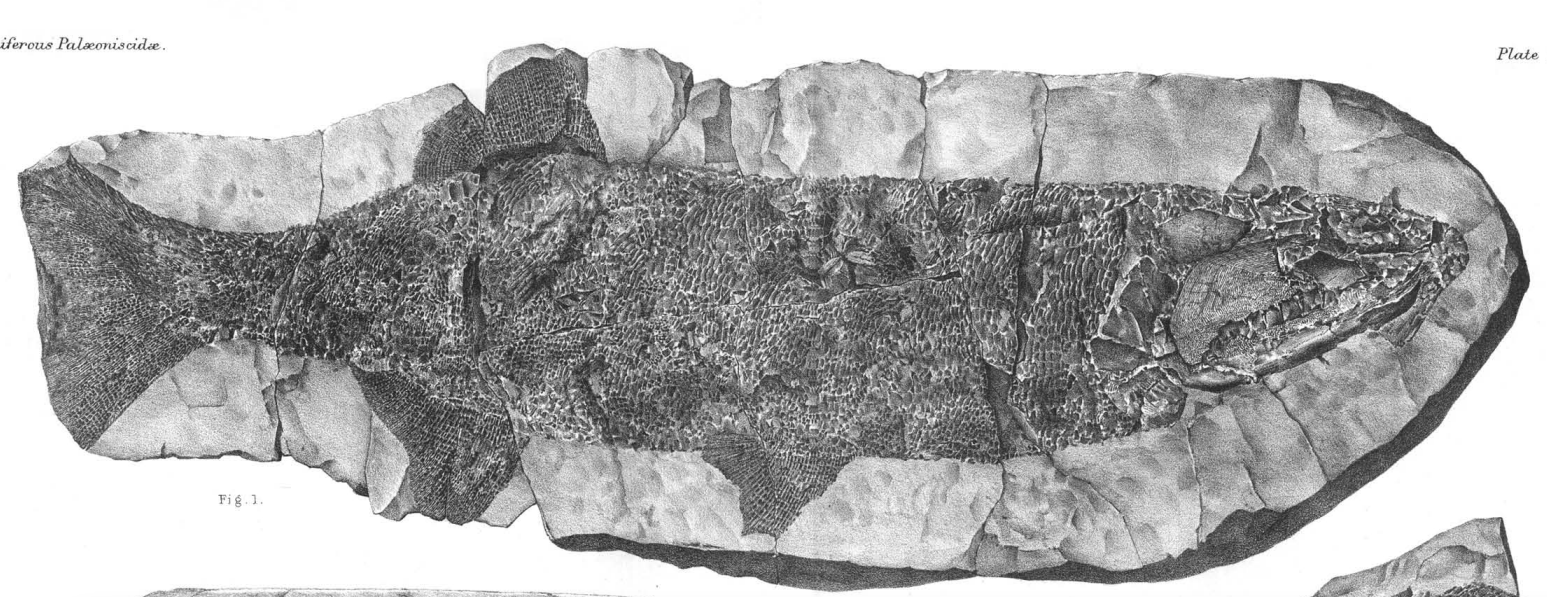
- Specimen of Nematoptychius greenocki

Scientific classification
- Kingdom: Animalia
- Phylum: Chordata
- Class: Actinopterygii
- Order: †Palaeonisciformes
- Genus: †Nematoptychius; Traquair, 1875

Type species
- †Pygopterus greenocki Traquair, 1866

Species
- †N. gracilis Traquair, 1877; †N. greenocki (Traquair, 1866)

= Nematoptychius =

Nematoptychius Temporal range: Visean–Bashkirian

Extinct genus of ray-finned fishes

Nematoptychius is an extinct genus of ray-finned fish that lived from the Visean age of the Mississippian epoch (Early Carboniferous) to the Bashkirian age of the Pennsylvanian epoch (Late Carboniferous) in what is now Scotland, Belgium and France.

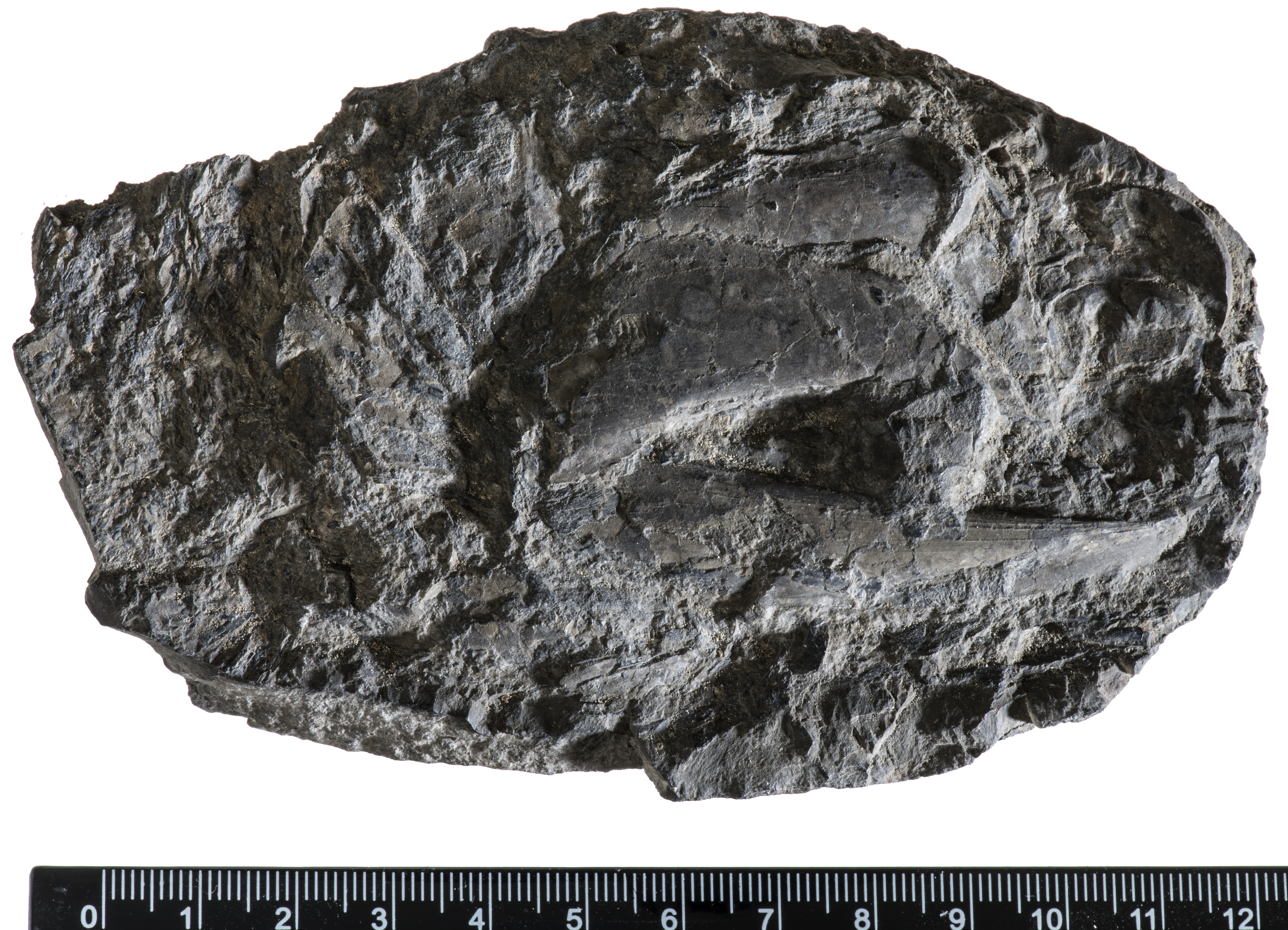
Fossil skull of N. greenocki

Its type species, Nematoptychius greenocki, was first described as Pygopterus greenocki by Ramsay Traquair.
