= Vladimir Prokhorovich Amalitskii =

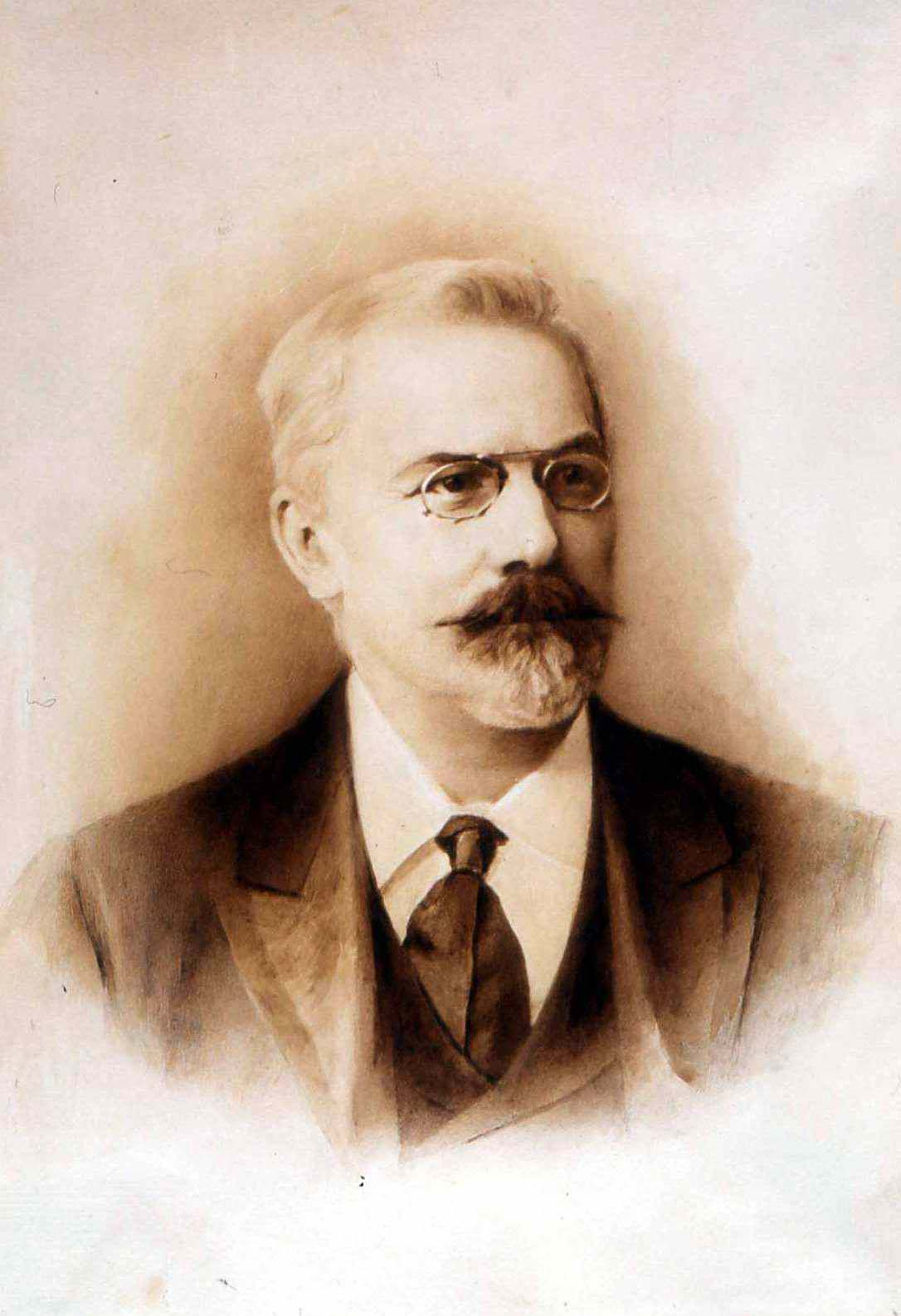
- Amalitskii before 1917
- Born: July 13, 1860; Volhynian Governorate
- Died: December 28, 1917 (aged 57); Kislovodsk
- Education: SPb University
- Scientific career
- Fields: Paleontology
- Workplaces: Warsaw University

Vladimir Prokhorovich Amalitskii (Russian: Владимир Прохорович Амалицкий; July 13, 1860 – December 28, 1917) (alternative spelling: Amalitzky) was a paleontologist and professor at Warsaw University. He was involved in the discovery and excavation of the Late Permian fossil vertebrate fauna from the North Dvina River, Arkhangelsk District, Northern European Russia. He made a number of studies of the fossil remains of amphibians and reptiles from Northern Russia.

Amalitskii was born in the village of Staryky, near Korosten in what is now Zhytomyr Oblast in Ukraine.

Amalitskii and his wife Anna Petrovna, who had studied art in St. Petersburg, illustrated and translated books and articles together. Together they uncovered the first fossils of Scutosaurus

He died from sudden heart failure in Kislovodsk on December 28, 1917, aged 57.

== Partial bibliography ==
- Amalitskii, V.P., Dvinosauridae Petrograd : Akademicheskaia tip., 1921. 16 p., 4 leaves of plates : ill. -- (Severodvinskie raskopki professora V.P. Amalitskogo;
- Amalitskii, V.P., Seymouridae, Petrograd : Akademicheskaia tip., 1921. 14 p., [3] leaves of plates : ill. -- (Severodvinskie raskopki professora V.P. Amalitskogo; 2)
- Amalitzky, V.P., 1922, Diagnoses of the new forms of vertebrates and plants from the upper Permian of North Dvina: Bulletin de l’Académie des Sciences de l'URSS, Math and Natural Sciences, 1922, p. 329-340. and in Izv. Ross. Akad. Nauk, Ser. 6 25 (1), 1–12.
