= Priscopedatidae =

Scientific classification
- Kingdom: Animalia
- Phylum: Echinodermata
- Class: Holothuroidea
- Family: †Priscopedatidae; Frizzell and Exline 1955

Genera
- †Priscopedatus; †Soodanella; †Staurocumites

Family of echinoderms

Priscopedatidae is a prehistoric family of extinct sea cucumbers.
