= Priscopedatus =

Priscopedatus Temporal range: Triassic

Scientific classification
- Domain: Eukaryota
- Kingdom: Animalia
- Phylum: Echinodermata
- Class: Holothuroidea
- Family: †Priscopedatidae
- Genus: †Priscopedatus; Schlumberger, 1890

Extinct genus of sea cucumbers

Priscopedatus is an extinct genus of sea cucumbers which existed in Poland during the Triassic period. The type species is Priscopedatus pyramidalis. It also contains the species Priscopedatus normani, Priscopedatus mostleri, Priscopedatus triassicus, Priscopedatus elliptiferus.
