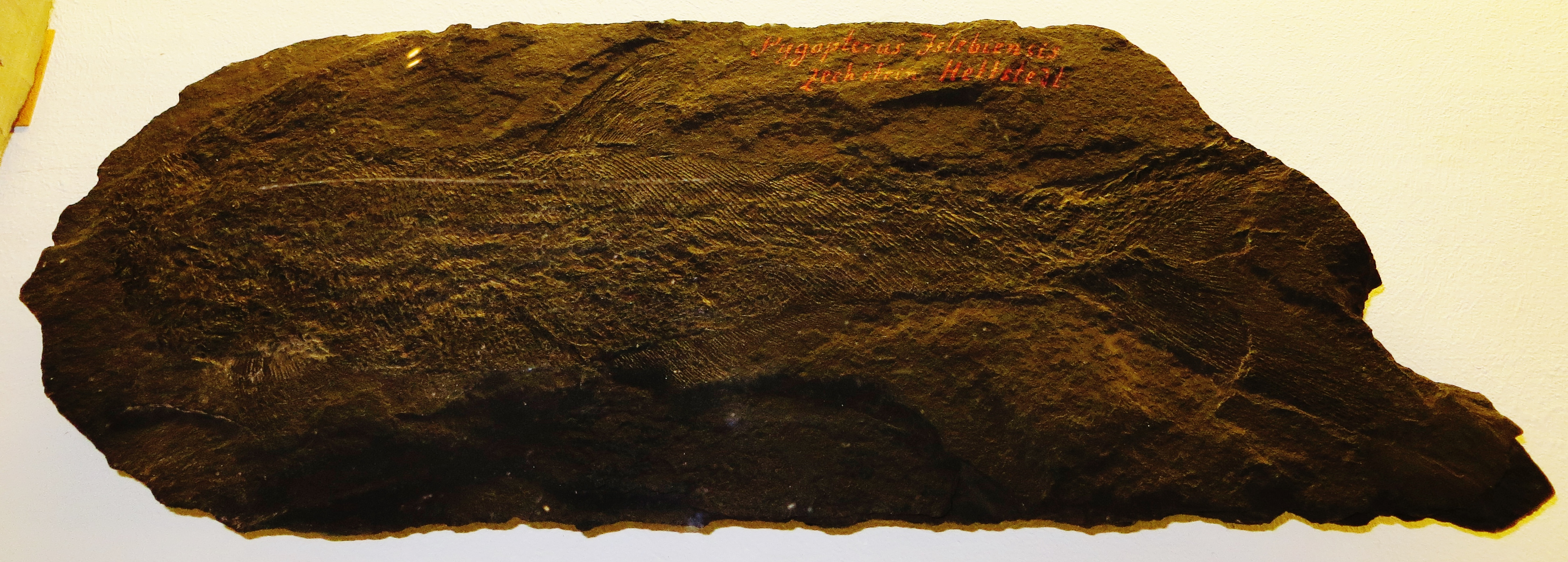
- P. humboldti fossil (Museum of Paleontology, Tübingen)

Scientific classification
- Kingdom: Animalia
- Phylum: Chordata
- Class: Actinopterygii
- Family: †Pygopteridae
- Genus: †Pygopterus; Agassiz, 1833

Type species
- †Palaeothrissium humboldti Blainville, 1818

Other species
- †P. degeeri Stensiö, 1921; †P. crecelli Wilser, 1923; †P. gleerupi Aldinger, 1937; †P. nielseni Aldinger, 1937

= Pygopterus =

Pygopterus Temporal range: Wuchiapingian–Olenekian

Extinct genus of fishes

Pygopterus is an extinct genus of prehistoric bony fish that lived during the Wuchiapingian to Olenekian ages (late Permian to Early Triassic epochs) in what is now England, Germany (Baden-Württemberg, Saxony-Anhalt), Greenland and Svalbard (Spitsbergen). It is one of the few genera of ray-finned fish known to cross the Permian-Triassic boundary.

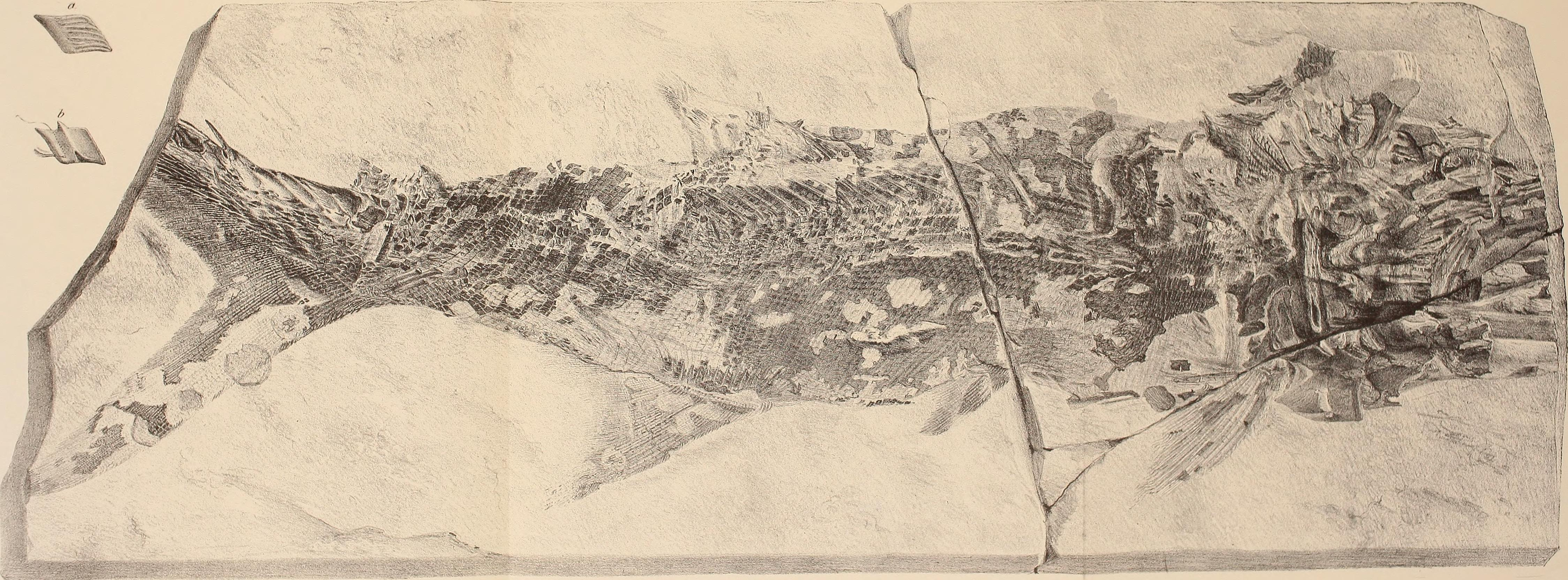
†Pygopterus humboldti

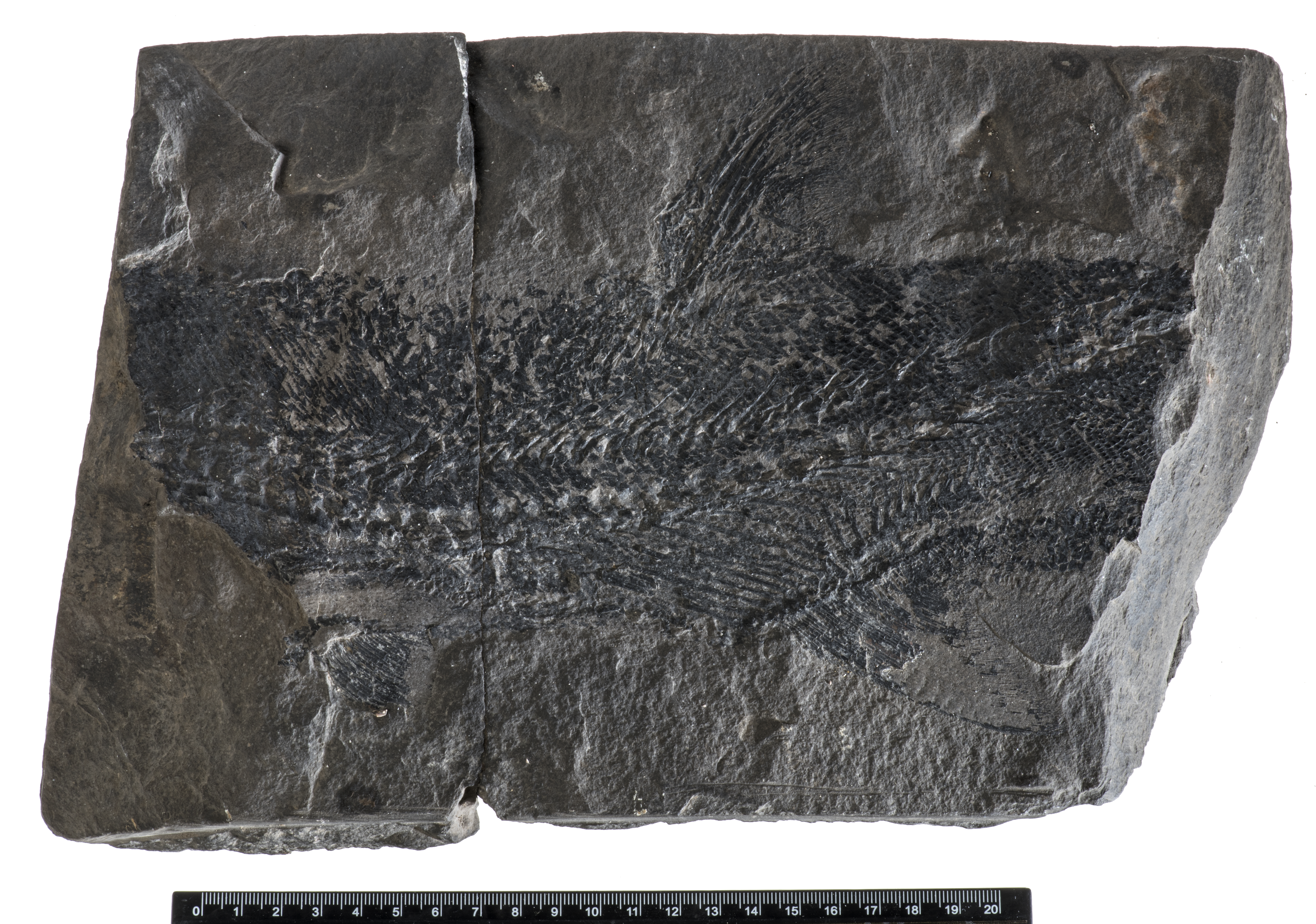
†Pygopterus humboldti fossil

Fossils have been found in the Marl Slate Formation, Kupferschiefer (Werra Formation), Ravnefjeld Formation, Vikinghøgda Formation and Buntsandstein. A report about the discovery of this fish in Westphalian deposits of Belgium was likely caused by the presence of Nematoptychius which was referred to as Pygopterus in late 19th century.

== Synonyms ==
- Pygopterus greenockii Traquair, 1866 → Nematoptychius greenockii (Traquair, 1866)

== See also ==
- Prehistoric fish
- List of prehistoric bony fish
- Permian-Triassic mass extinction
