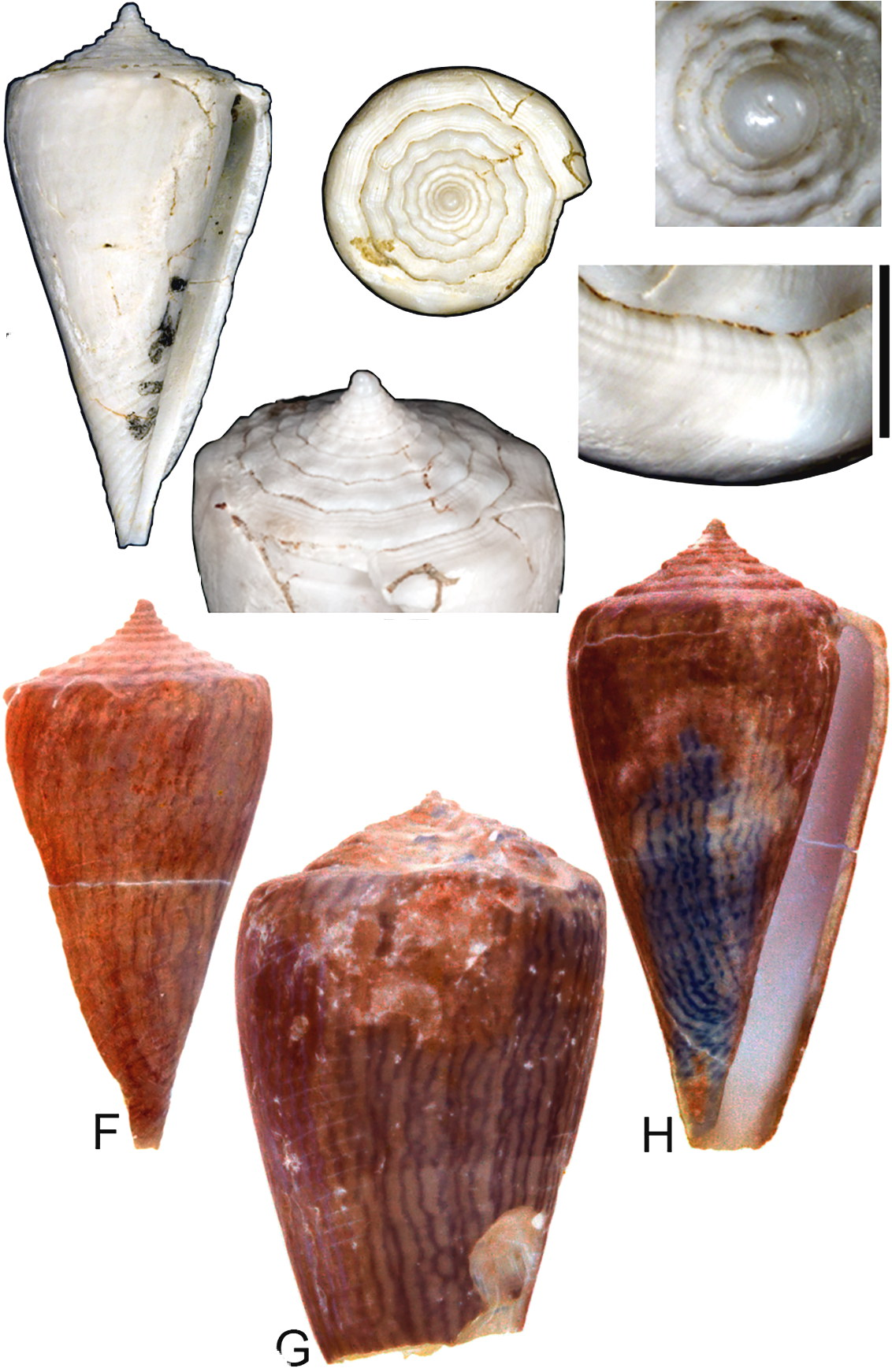
- Several images of Conus cashi; the colored images (F, G, H) are reversed images photographed under UV light

Conservation status
- Extinct

Scientific classification
- Kingdom: Animalia
- Phylum: Mollusca
- Class: Gastropoda
- Subclass: Caenogastropoda
- Order: Neogastropoda
- Superfamily: Conoidea
- Family: Conidae
- Genus: Conus
- Species: †C. cashi

Binomial name
- †Conus cashi Hendricks, 2015

Synonyms
- † Conus (Ductoconus) cashi Hendricks, 2015 · accepted, alternate representation

= Conus cashi =

Species of sea snail

Conus cashi is a fossil species of sea snail, a marine gastropod mollusk in the family Conidae, commonly known as cone snails, cone shells or cones.

== Description ==
The size of the shell attains 26 mm.

== Distribution ==
This marine species is only found as a fossil in the Neogene of the Dominican Republic.
