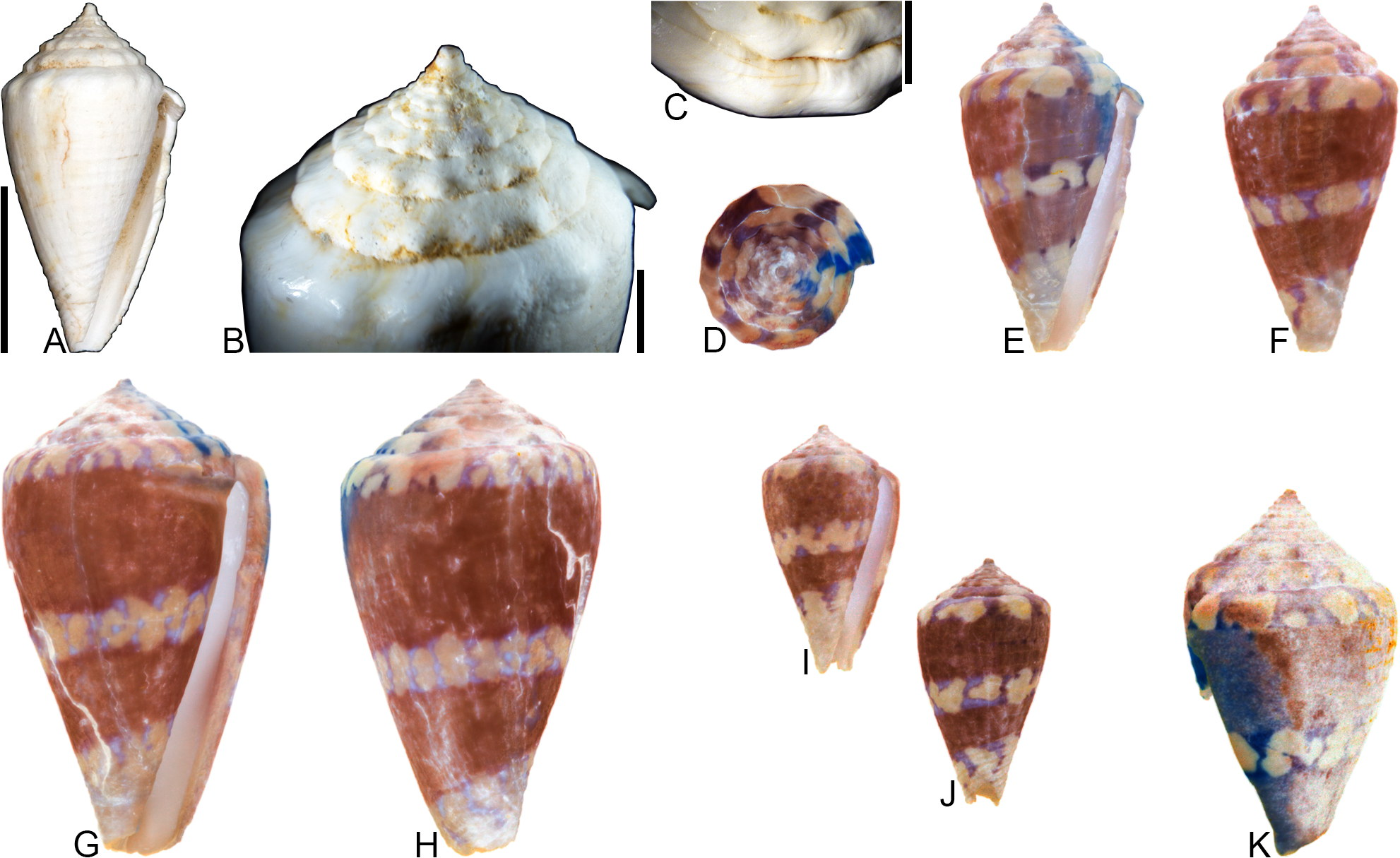
- Several views of Conus garrisoni; the brown-colored specimens are reversed images of specimens photographed under UV light

Conservation status
- Extinct

Scientific classification
- Kingdom: Animalia
- Phylum: Mollusca
- Class: Gastropoda
- Subclass: Caenogastropoda
- Order: Neogastropoda
- Superfamily: Conoidea
- Family: Conidae
- Genus: Conus
- Species: †C. garrisoni

Binomial name
- †Conus garrisoni Hendricks, 2015

Synonyms
- † Conus (Dauciconus) garrisoni Hendricks, 2015 · accepted, alternate representation

= Conus garrisoni =

Species of sea snail

Conus garrisoni is a fossil species of sea snail, a marine gastropod mollusk in the family Conidae, the cone snails, cone shells or cones.

== Description ==
The size of the shell attains 27.2 mm.

== Distribution ==
This marine species of cone snail is found as a fossil in the Neogene of the Dominican Republic.
