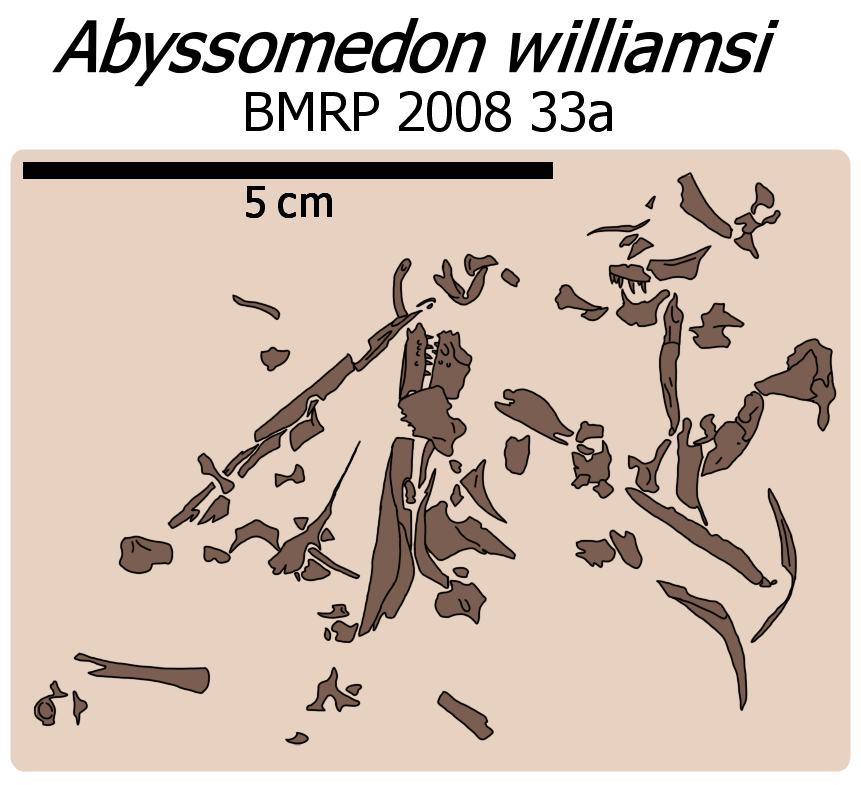
- Illustration of the holotype fossil

Scientific classification
- Kingdom: Animalia
- Phylum: Chordata
- Class: Reptilia
- Family: †Nyctiphruretidae
- Genus: †Abyssomedon; MacDougall & Reisz, 2014

Type species
- †Abyssomedon williamsi MacDougall & Reisz, 2014

= Abyssomedon =

Abyssomedon Temporal range: Early Permian, 289 Ma

Extinct genus of reptiles

Abyssomedon (meaning "Guardian of the Abyss") is an extinct genus of a nyctiphruretid known from Early Permian (Artinskian age) fissure fills at Richards Spur in Comanche County, Oklahoma, south-central United States. It contains a single species, Abyssomedon williamsi, which represents oldest known nyctiphruretid species and the first to be discovered in North America.

== Discovery ==
Abyssomedon is known solely from the holotype BMRP 2008 33a, a partial skeleton housed at the Burpee Museum of Natural History at Rockford, Illinois. The specimen consists of a semi-articulated partial skull and disarticulated but associated postcranial remains. BMRP 2008 33a was discovered in 2008 in a claystone and conglomerate nodule found at Oklahoma Museum of Natural History (OMNH) Locality V51. This site, known as Richards Spur, is located just west of U.S. Highways 62 & 281, 10.5 miles south of Apache and 6 miles north of Fort Sill, of Comanche County, Oklahoma. The fossils of Richards Spur are found in Early Permian fissure fills in Ordovician limestone.

Abyssomedon was first described and named by Mark J. MacDougall and Robert R. Reisz in 2014 and the type species is Abyssomedon williamsi. The generic name is derived from Greek Abyssos, meaning "deep pit", and -medon, meaning "guardian", in reference to the cave system at Richards Spur. The specific name williamsi honor the collector of the holotype Mr. Scott Williams, a paleontologist at the Burpee Museum.

== Classification ==
The following cladogram is simplified after the phylogenetic analysis of MacDougall and Reisz (2014) and shows the placement of Abyssomedon within Parareptilia. Relationships within bolded clades are not shown.

- Parareptilia
  - Mesosaurus
  - - **Millerosauria**
    - Procolophonomorpha
      - Australothyris smithi
      - Hallucicrania (=Ankyramorpha)
        - Lanthanosuchoidea
          - Feeserpeton oklahomensis
          - - - Colobomycter pholeter
              - Delorhynchus cifellii
            - - Acleistorhinus pteroticus
              - Lanthanosuchus watsoni
        - - Microleter mckinzieorum
          - - Bolosauridae
              - Belebey chengi
              - Eudibamus cursoris
            - Procolophonia
              - Pareiasauromorpha
                - **Nycteroleteridae**
                - **Pareiasauria**
              - - Nyctiphruretidae
                  - **Abyssomedon williamsi**
                  - Nyctiphruretus acudens
                - Procolophonoidea
                  - **Owenettidae**
                  - **Procolophonidae**

== Paleoecology ==
The Richards Spur locality preserves a system of Early Permian sediments and fossils trapped in a cave eroded out of Ordovician Arbuckle Limestone. The Permian sediments of Richards Spur may be equivalent to the Garber Formation (also known as the Wellington Formation) elsewhere in Oklahoma, or the Arroyo Formation of Texas. Richards Spur presents a rich Early Permian vertebrate paleofauna, including species of Lepospondyli, seymouriamorphs, basal synapsids, basal eureptiles and many species of parareptiles apart from Abyssomedon, including the basal Microleter mckinzieorum, the bolosaurid Bolosaurus grandis, and the lanthanosuchoids such as Colobomycter pholeter, Delorhynchus priscus, Delorhynchus cifellii, and Feeserpeton oklahomensis. A speleotherm was used to Uranium-Lead date the deposits to 289 ± 0.86 million years ago, corresponding to the Artinskian stage. However, the deposits were likely deposited over several million years, as evidenced by wider speleotherm sampling.
