= Nyctiphruretidae =

Nyctiphruretids Temporal range: Early-Middle Permian, 289–265 Ma

Scientific classification
- Kingdom: Animalia
- Phylum: Chordata
- Class: Reptilia
- Clade: †Ankyramorpha
- Suborder: †Procolophonia
- Clade: †Nyctiphruretia; Lee, 1997
- Family: †Nyctiphruretidae; Efremov, 1938

Genera
- †Abyssomedon; †Nyctiphruretus

Extinct family of stem-reptiles

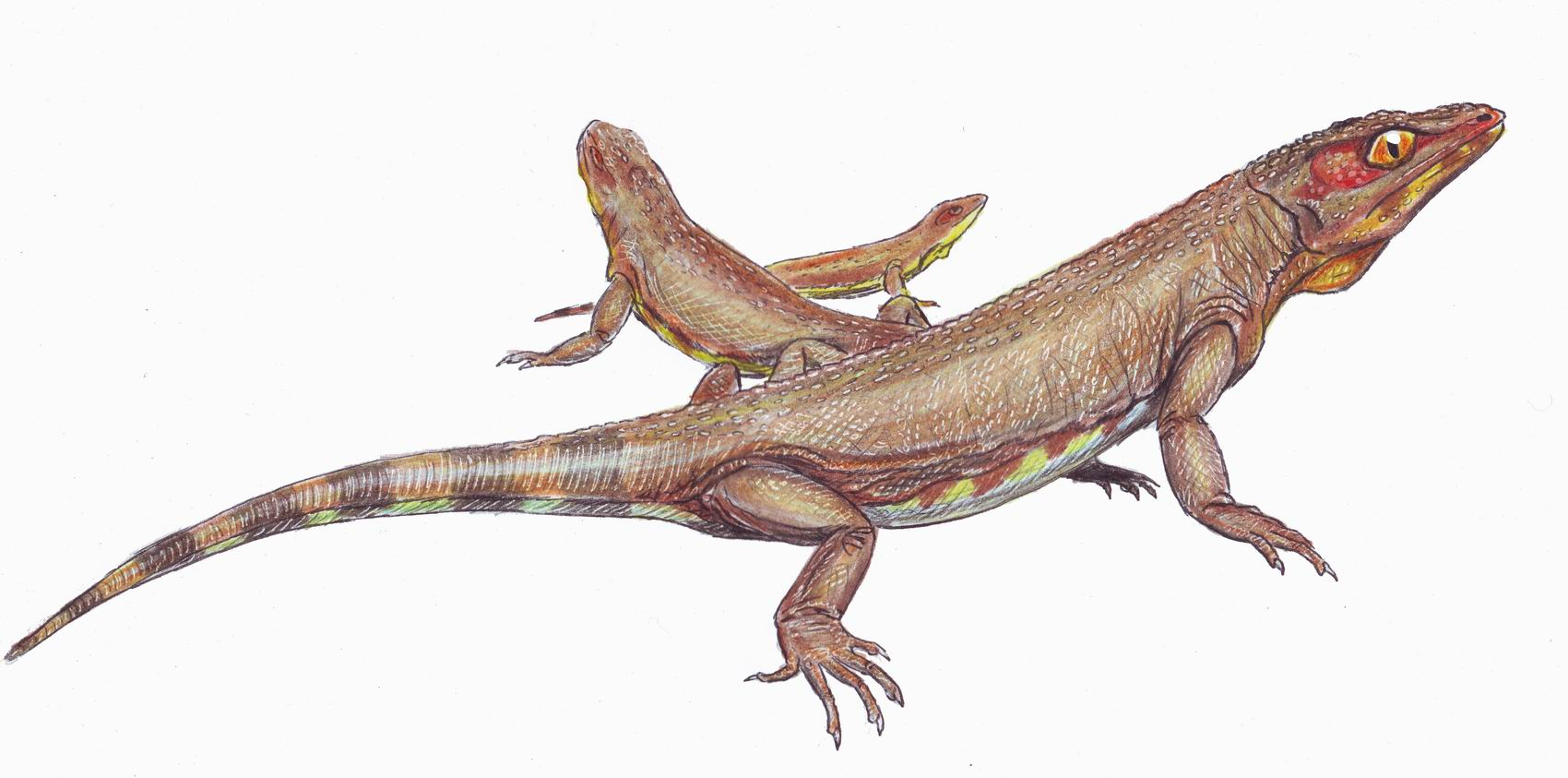
Life restoration of Nyctiphruretus acudens

Nyctiphruretidae is an extinct family of hallucicranian 'parareptiles' known from the late Early to late Middle Permian of European Russia and south-central United States.

Nyctiphruretidae was named by Efremov in 1938. The type genus is Nyctiphruretus known from several Middle Permian locations in European Russia. Michael S. Y. Lee in 1997 placed the family in the larger clade Nyctiphruretia. The order was defined to include both nyctiphruretids and nycteroleterids. However, recent cladistic analyses suggest that nycteroleterids are more closely related to the Pareiasauria instead, thus making Nyctiphruretus the only genus of its order. In 2014, MacDougall & Reisz described and named a second genus of Nyctiphruretidae, Abyssomedon, from the middle Leonardian stage of the late Early Permian of Comanche County, Oklahoma, south-central United States. It contains a single species, A. williamsi, which represents the first nyctiphruretid known from North America, and the oldest species of the family.

== Phylogeny ==
Before the discovery of Abyssomedon, all phylogenetic analyses including Säilä (2010) and Tsuji et al. (2012) recovered Nyctiphruretidae, which was represented solely by N. acudens, as the sister taxon of Procolophonia. However, the addition of Abyssomedon by MacDougall and Reisz (2014) to an updated version of the Tsuji et al. (2012) data-set, recovered a monophyletic Nyctiphruretidae, nested within Procolophonia as the sister taxon of Procolophonoidea - a clade formed by owenettids and procolophonids. The following cladogram is simplified after the phylogenetic analysis of MacDougall and Reisz (2014) and shows the placement of Nyctiphruretidae within Parareptilia. Relationships within bolded terminal clades are not shown.

- Parareptilia
  - Mesosaurus
  - - **Millerosauria**
    - Procolophonomorpha
      - Australothyris smithi
      - Hallucicrania (=Ankyramorpha)
        - Lanthanosuchoidea
          - Feeserpeton oklahomensis
          - - - Colobomycter pholeter
              - Delorhynchus cifellii
            - - Acleistorhinus pteroticus
              - Lanthanosuchus watsoni
        - - Microleter mckinzieorum
          - - Bolosauridae
              - Belebey chengi
              - Eudibamus cursoris
            - Procolophonia
              - Pareiasauromorpha
                - **Nycteroleteridae**
                - **Pareiasauria**
              - - **Nyctiphruretidae**
                  - Abyssomedon williamsi
                  - Nyctiphruretus acudens
                - Procolophonoidea
                  - **Owenettidae**
                  - **Procolophonidae**
