= Australothyris =

Australothyris Temporal range: Middle Permian, 265–260 Ma

Scientific classification
- Kingdom: Animalia
- Phylum: Chordata
- Class: Reptilia
- Subclass: †Parareptilia
- Order: †Procolophonomorpha
- Genus: †Australothyris; Modesto et al., 2009

Type species
- †Australothyris smithi Modesto et al., 2009

Extinct genus of reptiles

Australothyris is an extinct genus of basal procolophonomorph stem reptile known from the Middle Permian (middle Capitanian stage) of Tapinocephalus Assemblage Zone, South Africa. The type and only known species is Australothyris smithi. As a basal member of Procolophonomorpha, Australothyris helped to contextualize the origin of this major parareptile subgroup. It has been used to support the hypotheses that procolophonomorphs originated in Gondwana and ancestrally possess temporal fenestrae, due to its large and fully enclosed temporal fenestra and South African heritage. It also possessed several unique features, including a high tooth number, long postfrontal, small interpterygoid vacuity, and a specialized interaction between the stapes and quadrate.

== Discovery ==
Australothyris is known from a single specimen discovered at the Beukesplaas farm by Robert Smith in 1995. The fossil site at the Beukesplaas farm contains a diverse parareptile and synapsid fauna positioned in the Middle Permian Tapinocephalus Assemblage zone of the upper Abrahamskraal Formation. This specimen, SAM-PK-K8302, included most of a skull and portions of the rest of the skeleton, which had mostly been eroded away prior to its discovery. It was initially referred to Owenetta based on the numerous teeth and long postfrontal, until a reexamination revealed a temporal fenestra, which was absent in owenettids. In the wake of this restudy, the specimen was recognized as a new taxon, which was named Australohyris smithi by Sean P. Modesto, Diane M. Scott, and Robert R. Reisz in 2009. The generic name translates to "southern opening" in recognition that it supports the hypothesis that parareptiles originated in Gondwana and went through a phase of evolution where they possessed a temporal fenestra, an opening in the skull behind the eyes. The specific name honors Robert Smith.

== Description ==
Portions of the snout and upper skull have been weathered away, but many notable features are preserved. The maxilla contains 31 teeth, an unusually high number which is only surpassed by Microleter and Lanthanosuchus among parareptiles. The teeth are small, slender, and conical, retaining roughly the same size and shape except for a subtle decrease in size towards the rear of the maxilla. The prefrontal is simple, hosting a small buttress in front of the orbits (eye holes) and being dissimilar in shape to that of procolophonids. Although the frontal does contact the upper edge of the orbit as in other amniotes, it lacks the distinct lappet observed in lanthanosuchoids. A distinct lateral temporal fenestra is present behind the orbit, completely surrounded by the jugal, quadratojugal, postorbital and squamosal. Other parareptiles with lateral temporal fenestrae (apart from lanthanosuchids) typically exclude the postorbital from its edge through contact between the jugal and squamosal, or have an open lower edge due to a loss of contact between the jugal and quadratojugal. The postfrontal is uniquely elongated, as its rear branch contacts the boxy supratemporal bone and separates the postorbital from the parietal. The pineal foramen is large, similar in size to that of procolophonids and bolosaurids. The quadrates are massive, being quite broad but also not very tall as in Acleistorhinus. Minor ornamentation is present on several bones, including broad grooves (on the nasal), shallow pits (on the jugal), clusters of knobs and furrows (on the postorbital), and low mounds (on the squamosal).

The vomers possess an array of ridges, the largest being at the edge of the choanae. There are also teeth in small rows or solitary positions on the vomers. The palatines are characteristically large, possessing several low ridges covered with small teeth. The pterygoids were notably broad, owing to extensive contact with each other along the midline of the palate. As a consequence, the interpterygoid vacuity (gap between the pterygoids) is short, restricted to a triangular opening in front of the parabasisphenoid. Tooth rows occur along the inner edge of the pterygoids, on the main underside of the bones, and at the transverse flanges at their rear. The branches of the pterygoids leading to the quadrates are offset from the transverse flanges by a distinct notch. Overall the palate most closely resembles that of Lanthanosuchus. Uniquely, Australothyris even possesses patches of teeth on the basipterygoid processes of the parabasisphenoid.

The rest of the braincase was fairly typical. The basioccipital was broad, with poorly-developed basitubera and kidney-shaped occipital condyle, and the exoccipitals do not meet at the midline of the foramen magnum. The supraoccipital was also broad and fused with the opisthotics in its lower portion, while the upper portion of the bone was overlapped by the small postparietal and tabular bones of the skull roof. The opisthotics were thickest at the base and generally similar to those of Milleretta. They each connected to a thick yet complex stapes which possessed a conspicuous footplate, stapedial foramen, and a dorsal process. A knob on the outer edge of the stapes likely connected to a characteristic spur on the quadrate. What can be seen of the lower jaw indicates that it was primarily formed by the dentary in its front half, and the low, elongated surangular and angular in its rear half. The coronoid had a low peak and the tall articular had a small retroarticular process. Only one tooth was exposed, and it was similar to those of the maxilla, albeit smaller.

The articulated postcranial skeleton is weathered to the point that only portions of the cervical vertebrae and interclavicle are in good enough condition to describe. The cervicals had slight excavations on their outer surface, robust neural arches, and low neural spines, with that of the axis overhanging its predecessor. The interclavicle is anchor-shaped (like ankyramorph, or "anchor-form" parareptiles), but in contrast to ankyramorphs, the center of the interclavicle is thicker than the front edge. Overall the postcranium is congruent with that known for Milleretta.

== Classification ==
The original describers of Australothyris used a phylogenetic analysis designed by Muller & Tsuji (2007) to investigate its relations to other parareptiles. The analysis found that it had an optimal position as a relatively basal parareptile, specifically the sister taxon to Ankyramorpha (the group containing lanthanosuchoids and more derived parareptiles). This was nevertheless more derived than mesosaurs and millerettids, and the paper's authors assigned the name Procolophonomorpha to parareptiles more derived than millerettids. Australothyris was recovered as the first branch of Procolophonomorpha, suggesting that the group as a whole originated simultaneously with the evolution of a large, fully enclosed temporal fenestra in parareptiles. However, the subsequent discovery of Microleter, which had a roughly equivalent phylogenetic position and a much more restricted temporal emargination, casts doubts on this hypothesis for the origin of temporal fenestration. Certain millerettids have also been observed to possess temporal fenestrae. The position of Australothyris also supports another hypothesis which argues that procolophonomorphs evolved in Gondwana (southern Pangea) before spreading to and diversifying in more northern regions, although Microleter, known from Oklahoma, once more casts doubt on this hypothesis.

Cladogram after Modesto, Scott, & Reisz (2009).

- Parareptilia
  - Mesosauridae
  - - Millerosauria
    - Procolophonomorpha
      - Australothyris
      - Ankyramorpha
        - Lanthanosuchoidea
        - - Bolosauridae
          - - Nyctiphruretus
            - Procolophonia
