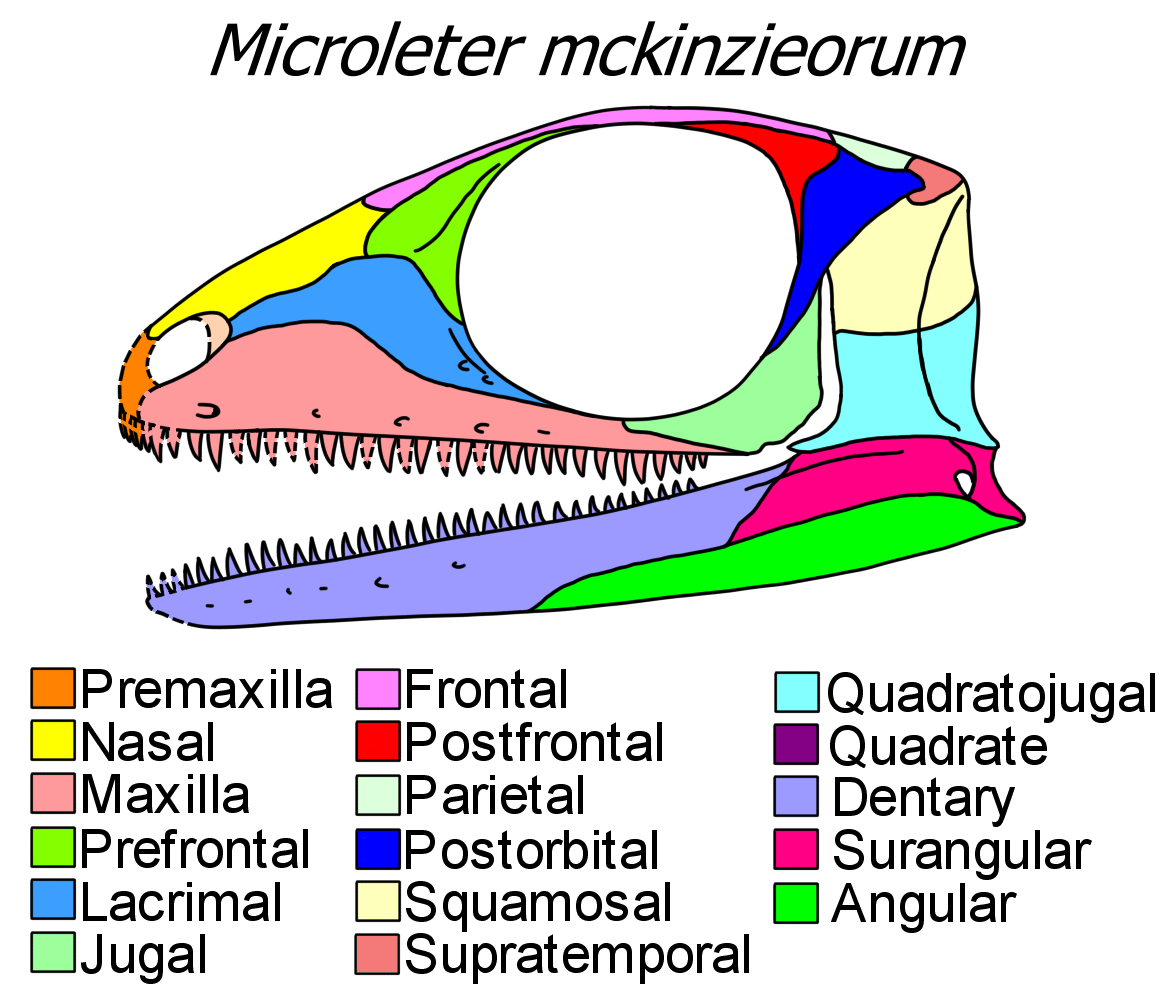
- Skull diagram

Scientific classification
- Kingdom: Animalia
- Phylum: Chordata
- Class: Reptilia
- Subclass: †Parareptilia
- Order: †Procolophonomorpha
- Clade: †Ankyramorpha
- Genus: †Microleter; Tsuji et al., 2010

Type species
- †Microleter mckinzieorum Tsuji et al., 2010

= Microleter =

Microleter Temporal range: Early Permian, 289–286 Ma

Extinct genus of reptiles

Microleter is an extinct genus of basal procolophonomorph parareptiles which lived in Oklahoma during the Early Permian period. The type and only known species is Microleter mckinzieorum. Microleter is one of several parareptile taxa described from the Richards Spur fissure fills, and can be characterized from its high tooth count, lacrimal/narial contact, short postfrontal, and slit-like temporal emargination edged by the postorbital, jugal, squamosal, and quadratojugal. Contrary to Australothyris, which had a similar phylogenetic position as a basal procolophonomorph, Microleter suggests that early parareptile evolution occurred in Laurasia and that multiple lineages developed openings or emarginations in the temporal region.

== Discovery ==
The only known specimen of Microleter is a well-preserved skull and lower jaw designated as OMNH 71306, the holotype specimen. It was found at the Dolese Brothers limestone quarry near Richards Spur in Comanche County, Oklahoma. Historically referred to as the Fort Sill locality, the quarry has preserved Early Permian (Artinskian, ~289-286 Ma) fissure fills in an Ordovician cave system. The fissure fills have yielded many other well preserved tetrapod fossils, including the most diverse assortment of Permian parareptiles in North America.

Microleter mckinzieorum was named by paleontologists Linda A. Tsuji, Johannes Muller, and Robert R. Reisz in 2010. The genus name combined Greek "mikros" (small) with "-oleter" (murderer), a suffix common to parareptile genera. The specific name honors the McKinzie family, as the specimen was discovered by Mark McKinzie.

== Description ==
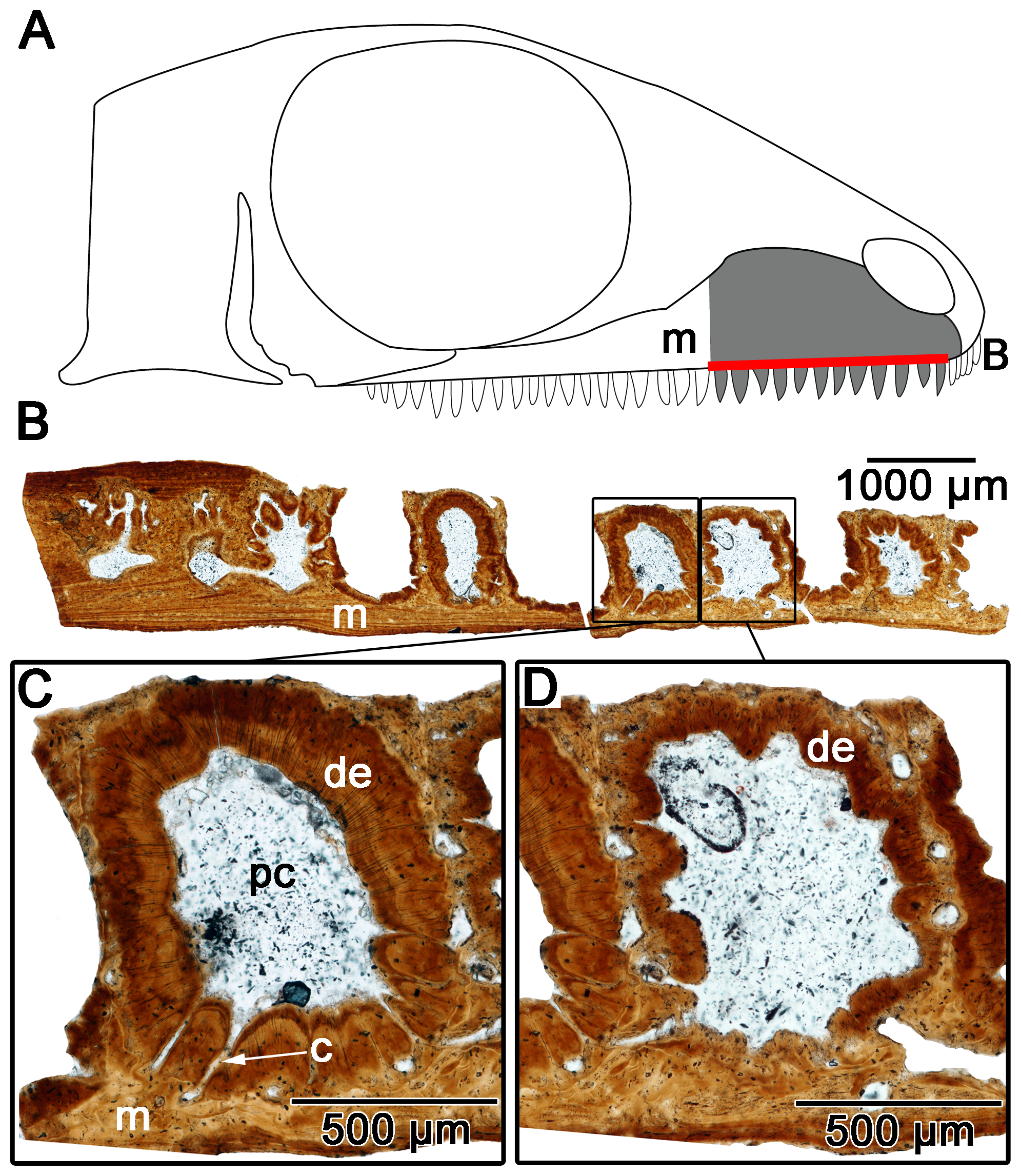
Microleter teeth in cross-section, showing loosely folded plicidentine

Based on the skull's large orbits (eye holes) and weak sutures, the specimen was likely a juvenile. Most of the skull bones were externally textured by radiating pits and furrows, with both sparse large pits and numerous tiny pits as in basal lanthanosuchoids. The only smoothly textured bones of the skull roof were the maxilla, squamosal, and quadratojugal. The maxilla was long and narrow, possessing conical teeth which only differed from each other in a slight shortening trend towards the rear of the maxilla. The maxillary tooth count was 32 or 33, more than any other parareptile apart from Lanthanosuchus. Like several other basal parareptiles, Microleter had teeth with plicidentine, a type of internally folded dentine which is most common in "labyrinthodont" amphibians. Although the lacrimal was not complete, the internal texture of the overlapping maxilla indicates that it extended to the nares (nostril holes), a trait also observed in millerettids, pareiasaurs, and bolosaurids.

The front edge of the orbit was thick due to an internal flange on the prefrontal, akin to that of procolophonids and Colobomycter. The upper edge of the orbit had a slight contribution by the frontal bone, though more restricted than that of lanthanosuchoids and procolophonoids. The jugal and particularly the postfrontal are both small and crescent-shaped. The postorbital, by contrast, is larger and extends to near the rear edge of the skull roof. Along with the jugal, squamosal, and quadratojugal, the postorbital edges a tall, narrow opening in the rear portion of the skull. This opening, termed a ventral temporal emargination, is likely homologous to the temporal opening present in various other parareptiles. The slit-like opening of Microleter is proportionally similar to that of Nyctiphruretus, although differs in the participation of the postorbital in its border. However, other parareptiles with postorbital participation (Australothyris and lanthanosuchids) have their opening fully surrounded by bone, while that of Microleter is open from below. The rear of the skull is not very long, with a broad parietal, small supratemporal, solitary postparietal, and tall, boxy squamosal and quadratojugal which are excavated along their rear edge.

Most of the palate is obscured by overlapping bones. The palatine is very broad, while the transverse flange of the pterygoid is oriented forwards. What can be seen of the braincase indicates that Microleter had tubular paroccipital processes, rather than fan-shaped ones present in other parareptiles. The elongated dentary is ornamented with small pits, but its teeth are obscured and cannot be properly counted. The surangular possesses a folded ridge on its outer surface, and encompasses the front half of a hole at the rear of the jaw. The rear half of the hole is edged by the articular bone. Microleter is one of the few parareptiles to have preserved part of the scleral ring, which was formed by tall, concave plates. A few cervical vertebrae are the only fossilized postcranial elements, but they are poorly preserved.

== Classification ==
Microleter is one of the most basal parareptiles, and was originally described as the most basal parareptile from Laurasia. Before the description of Microleter, parareptiles were hypothesized to have originated in Gondwana. However, Microleter appears in Laurasia soon after the earliest known parareptiles, and spurred discussion supporting the origin of parareptiles in Laurasia. Other factors in support of a Laurasian origin are the early appearance of the Laurasian bolosaurians, the fact that the other two clades of amniotes, synapsids and eureptiles, are both considered to have been Laurasian in origin, and evidence from varanopids that colonization of Gondwana by Laurasian amniotes was more common than the reverse process.

The original description of Microleter used maximum parsimony and bayesian phylogenetic analyses to position it more derived than millerettids and less derived than lanthanosuchoids. In the parsimony analysis, it was in a polytomy with Australothyris and more derived taxa, which was resolved in the bayesian analysis to place Australothyris more basally.

Cladogram from the bayesian analysis of Tsuji, Muller, & Reisz (2010):

- Parareptilia
  - Mesosauridae
  - - Millerosauria
    - Procolophonomorpha
      - Australothyris
      - - Microleter
        - Ankyramorpha
          - Lanthanosuchoidea
          - - Bolosauridae
            - - Nyctiphruretus
              - Procolophonia

However, since the original description, various other analyses have each had slightly different conclusions on the position of Microleter, placing it as the sister taxon of Australothyris, basal to Australothyris, or as a basal ankyramorph more derived than lanthanosuchoids,
