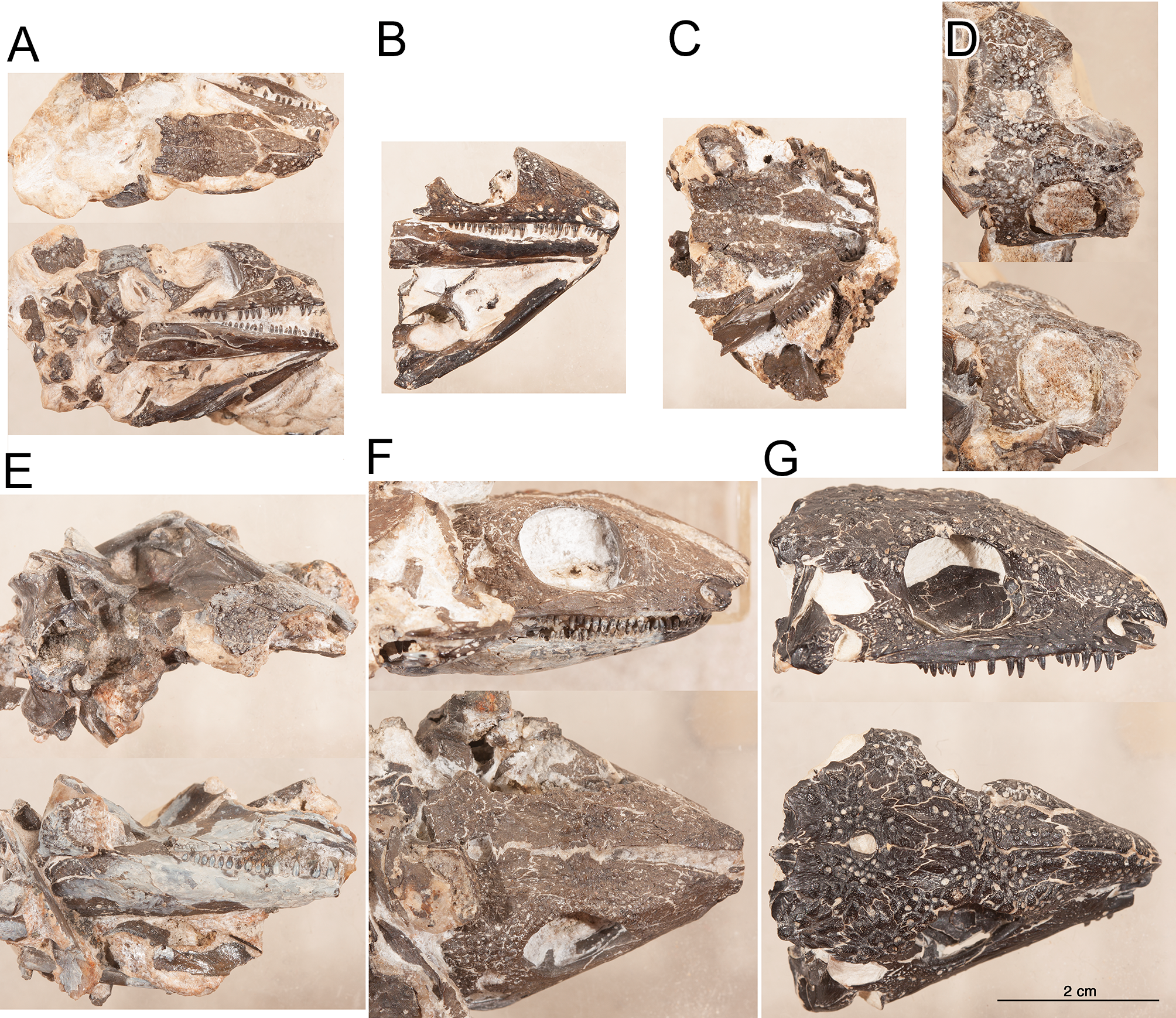
- Skull of Delorhynchus, a acleistorhinid
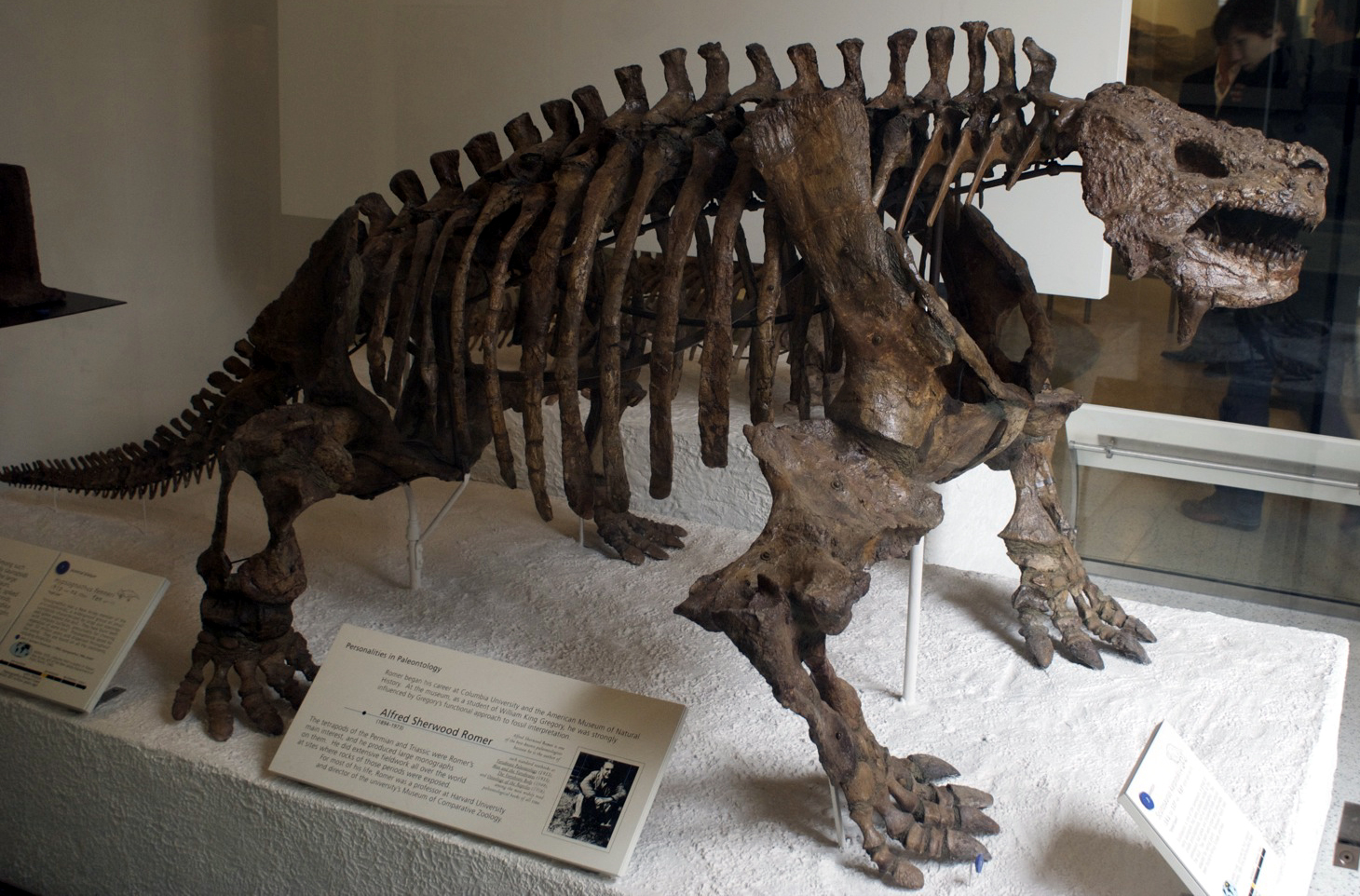
- Skeleton of Scutosaurus karpinskii, a procolophonian

Scientific classification
- Kingdom: Animalia
- Phylum: Chordata
- Class: Reptilia
- Clade: Neoreptilia
- Clade: †Ankyramorpha; DeBraga & Rieppel, 1996

Subgroups
- †Microleter?; †Acleistorhinidae; †Procolophonia

Synonyms
- Hallucicrania Lee, 1995

= Ankyramorpha =

Ankyramorpha Temporal range: Early Permian to Late Triassic 306–201.3 Ma

Extinct clade of reptiles

Ankyramorpha ("anchor forms") is a proposed clade of early stem reptiles which lived between the early Cisuralian epoch (middle Sakmarian stage) and the latest Triassic period (latest Rhaetian stage) of Africa, Antarctica, Asia, Australia, Europe, North America and South America.

This clade was named in a 1996 parareptile study by Michael deBraga and Robert R. Reisz. They provided the name Ankyramorpha for a newly recognized clade encompassing "the most recent common ancestor of Procolophonia (including pareiasaurs and procolophonoids, among others) and Lanthanosuchoidea (which includes and Acleistorhinidae and Lanthanosuchidae) and all its descendants", and this clade name sees continued use among modern parareptile studies. A similar name, Hallucicrania, was provided in an earlier 1995 study by Michael S. Y. Lee, who defined it as the node-based taxon formed by the most recent common ancestor of lanthanosuchids and "pareiasauroids" (pareiasaurs + Sclerosaurus), and all its descendants. Unlike Ankyramorpha, which explicitly included procolophonoids, Hallucicrania was originally designed to exclude procolophonoids, which Lee's analysis argued to have split off prior to the divergence between lanthanosuchids and pareiasaurs. Nevertheless, purely considering the taxa encompassed by their definitions, Hallucicrania and Ankyramorpha refer to an identical grouping.

The following cladogram is simplified after the phylogenetic analysis of MacDougall and Reisz (2014) and shows the placement of Ankyramorpha within Parareptilia. Relationships within emboldened terminal clades are not shown.

- Parareptilia
  - Mesosaurus
  - - Millerosauria
    - Procolophonomorpha
      - Australothyris smithi
      - Ankyramorpha
        - Lanthanosuchoidea
          - Feeserpeton oklahomensis
          - - - Colobomycter pholeter
              - Delorhynchus cifellii
            - - Acleistorhinus pteroticus
              - Lanthanosuchus watsoni
        - - Microleter mckinzieorum
          - - Bolosauridae
              - Belebey chengi
              - Eudibamus cursoris
            - Procolophonia
              - Pareiasauromorpha
                - Nycteroleteridae
                - Pareiasauria
              - - Nyctiphruretidae
                  - Abyssomedon williamsi
                  - Nyctiphruretus acudens
                - Procolophonoidea
                  - Owenettidae
                  - Procolophonidae

Some studies from the early 2020s onward, have disputed the validity of Ankyramorpha (and Parareptilia more broadly), finding Procolophonia unrelated to bolosaurids, lanthanosuchids, and acleistorhinids. Other studies have recovered an Ankyramorpha only including Acleistorhinidae and Procolophonia as a monophyletic group, and Lanthanosuchus as not even a reptile at all. Cladogram after Jenkins et al. 2025, with "parareptiles" highlighted in orange:

- Sauropsida
  - †Araeoscelidia
  - - †Bolosauridae
    - - †Erpetonyx
      - Neoreptilia
        - †Ankyramorpha
          - †Acleistorhinidae
          - Procolophonia
            - †Pareiasauromorpha
            - †Procolophonoidea
        - - †Mesosauridae
          - - - †Cabarzia
              - - †Ascendonanus
                - †Orovenator
            - Parapleurota
              - †Millerettidae
              - Neodiapsida
                - †Younginidae
                - - †Tangasauridae
                  - - †Weigeltisauridae
                    - - †Claudiosaurus
                      - Sauria
                        - Lepidosauromorpha
                        - Archosauromorpha
