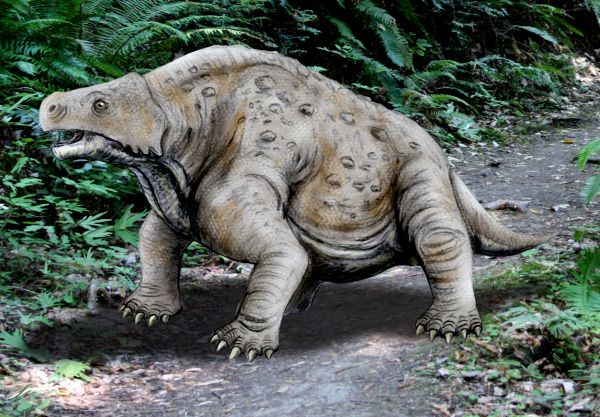
- Pareiasaurus (Pareiasauromorpha)
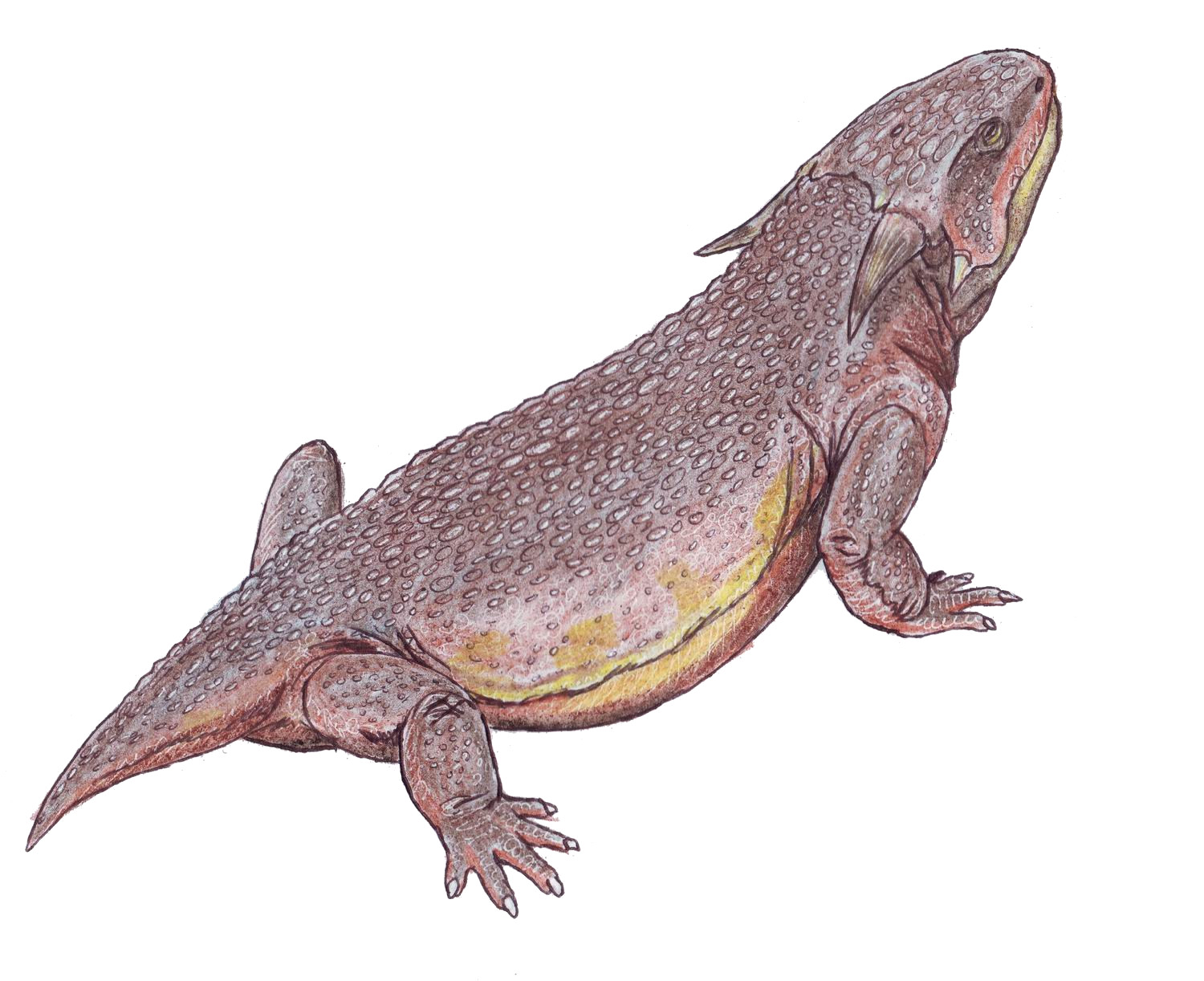
- Sclerosaurus (Procolophonoidea)

Scientific classification
- Kingdom: Animalia
- Phylum: Chordata
- Class: Reptilia
- Clade: †Ankyramorpha
- Suborder: †Procolophonia; Seeley, 1888

Subgroups
- Pareiasauromorpha; Nycteroleteridae; Pareiasauria; Nyctiphruretidae; Procolophonoidea; Owenettidae; Procolophonidae

= Procolophonia =

Procolophonians Temporal range: Guadalupian - Late Triassic, 272.3–201.3 Ma

Extinct suborder of reptiles

Procolophonia is an extinct clade of basal stem-reptiles, traditionally classified as "parareptiles", that lived from the Middle Permian until the end of the Triassic period. The group includes the largest known parareptiles, the up to oxen-sized herbivorous pareiasaurs, as well as the longest lived "parareptiles", the small lizard-like procolophonoids. Although traditionally grouped in Parareptilia, this classification scheme has been questioned.

== Characteristics ==
Procolophonians show the development of a fossa (depression) on the supratemporal bone, which is suggested to have supported a tympanic membrane for hearing, unlike most other "parareptiles". Tympanic hearing is also thought to have convergently evolved in the common ancestor of millerettids and neodiapsids (the ancestral group of modern reptiles and birds), which was supported by different bones.

== Classification ==
There are two main groups of Procolophonia, the small, lizard-like Procolophonoidea, and the Pareiasauroidea, which include the large, armoured Pareiasauridae. According to the traditional classification of Carroll 1988 as well as phylogenetic analyses of 2012, smaller groups like Rhipaeosauridae (now a synonym of Nycteroleteridae) and Sclerosauridae are classified with the pareiasaurs and with the procolophonids, respectively. The Nyctiphruretidae was thought to represent the sister taxon of Procolophonia by many studies, however recently discovered material places it within the group, as the sister taxon of Procolophonoidea.

The following cladogram is simplified after the phylogenetic analysis of MacDougall and Reisz (2014) and shows the placement of Procolophonia within Parareptilia. Relationships within bolded terminal clades are not shown.

- Parareptilia
  - Mesosaurus
  - - **Millerosauria**
    - Procolophonomorpha
      - Australothyris smithi
      - **Hallucicrania** (=Ankyramorpha)
        - **Lanthanosuchoidea**
        - - Microleter mckinzieorum
          - - **Bolosauridae**
            - **Procolophonia**
              - Pareiasauromorpha
                - **Nycteroleteridae**
                - **Pareiasauria**
              - - Nyctiphruretidae
                  - Abyssomedon williamsi
                  - Nyctiphruretus acudens
                - Procolophonoidea
                  - **Owenettidae**
                  - **Procolophonidae**

In a 2022, study, Simoes et al (2022) proposed that Parareptilia was paraphyletic, and that procolophonians were closely related to neodiapsids as part of the clade Neoreptilia. More recent studies have supported the paraphyly of Parareptilia, but have instead found procolophonians in a slightly more basal position among the earliest diverging neoreptiles.

- Reptiliomorpha
  - Seymouriamorpha
  - - Diadectomorpha
    - - - Araeoscelidia
        - - Protorothyris
          - Captorhinidae
      - Amniota
        - Synapsida
        - **Sauropsida**
          - Acleistorhinidae
          - - Millerettidae
            - - Mesosauria
              - Neoreptilia
                - Procolophonia
                - Neodiapsida (including modern reptiles and birds)

Cladogram after Jenkins et al. 2025:

- Sauropsida
  - †Araeoscelidia
  - - †Bolosauridae
    - - †Erpetonyx
      - Neoreptilia
        - †Ankyramorpha
          - †Acleistorhinidae
          - Procolophonia
            - †Pareiasauromorpha
            - †Procolophonoidea
        - - †Mesosauridae
          - - - †Cabarzia
              - - †Ascendonanus
                - †Orovenator
            - Parapleurota
              - †Millerettidae
              - Neodiapsida
                - †Younginidae
                - - †Tangasauridae
                  - - †Weigeltisauridae
                    - - †Claudiosaurus
                      - Sauria
                        - Lepidosauromorpha
                        - Archosauromorpha

== Relationship to turtles ==
The procolophonians were recently thought to be ancestral to the turtles, although experts disagreed over whether turtle ancestors would be found among the Procolophonidae, the Pareiasauridae (Lee 1995,1996, 1997), or simply a generic Procolophonian ancestor. Laurin & Reisz, 1995 and Laurin & Gauthier 1996 defined the Procolophonia cladistically as "The most recent common ancestor of pareiasaurs, procolophonids, and testudines (Chelonia), and all its descendants", and listed a number of autapomorphies. However, Rieppel and deBraga 1996 and deBraga & Rieppel, 1997 argued that turtles evolved from sauropterygians, which would mean that the Parareptilia and Procolophonia constitute wholly extinct clades that are only distantly related to living reptiles. The first genome-wide phylogenetic analysis of turtle relationships was completed by Wang et al. (2013). Using the draft genomes of Chelonia mydas and Pelodiscus sinensis, the team used the largest turtle data set to date in their analysis and concluded that turtles are likely a sister group of crocodilians and birds (Archosauria). This placement within the diapsids suggests that the turtle lineage lost diapsid skull characteristics as it now possesses an anapsid skull.
