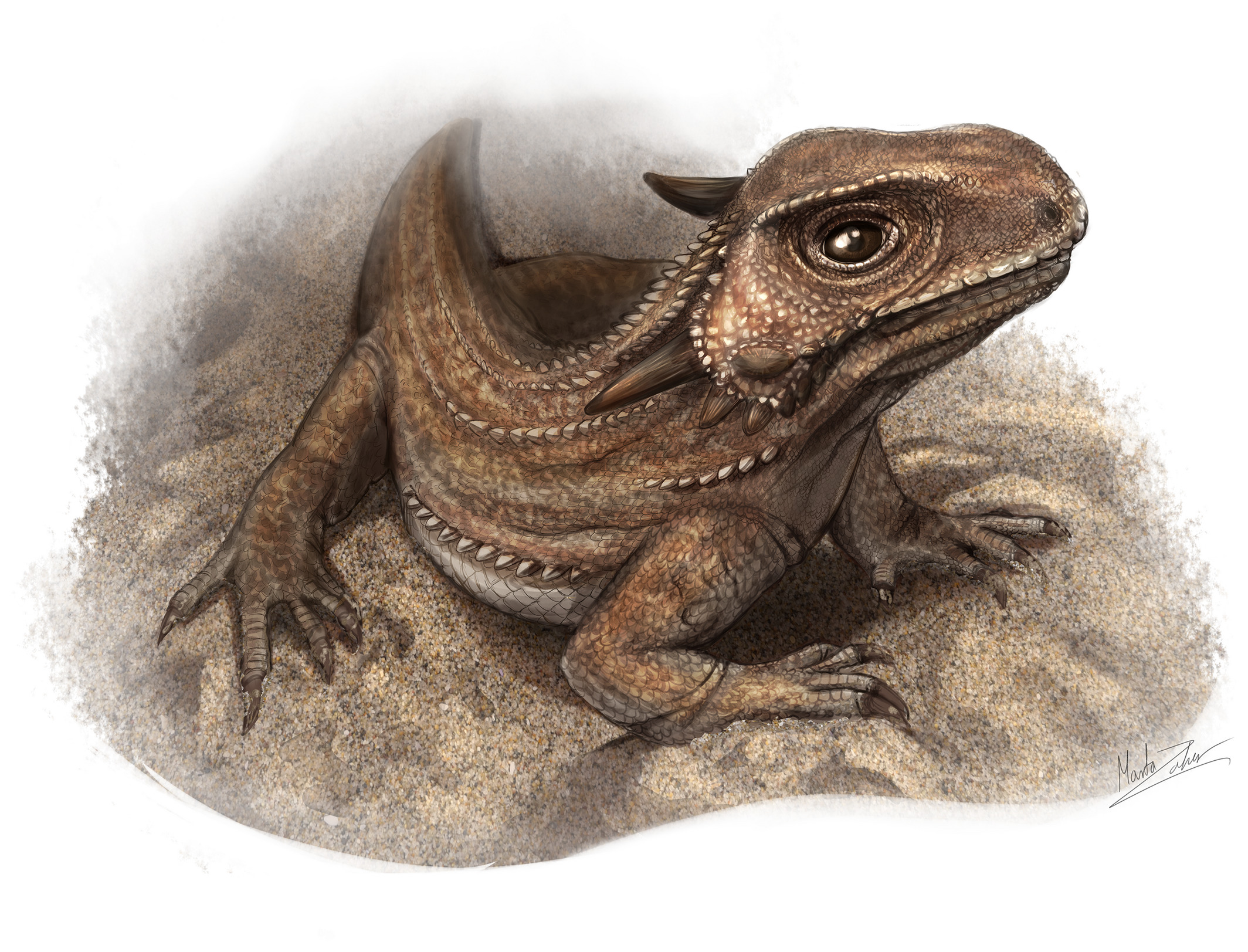
- Kapes bentoni (Procolophonidae)
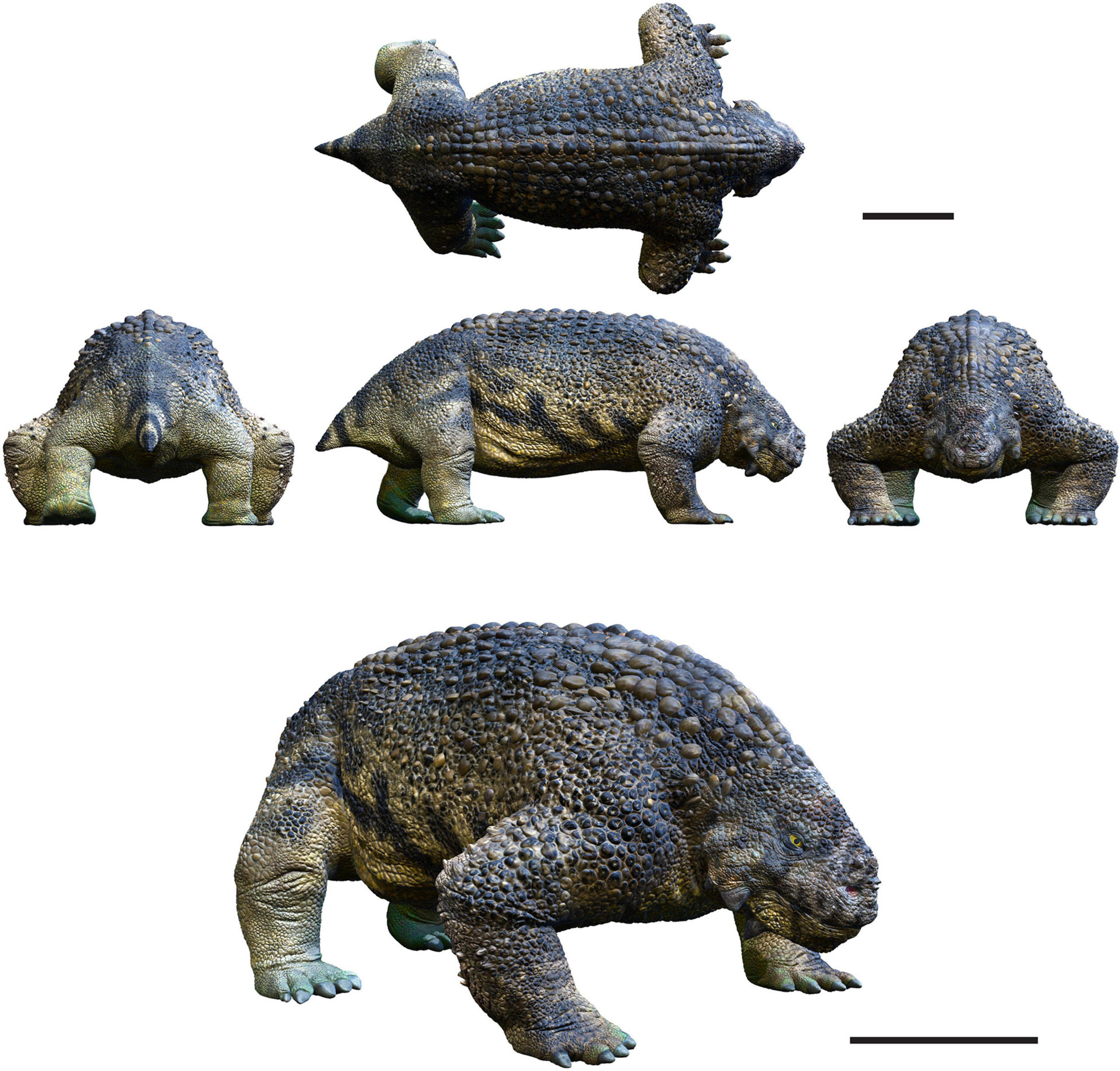
- Scutosaurus (Pareiasauria)

Scientific classification
- Kingdom: Animalia
- Phylum: Chordata
- Class: Reptilia
- Subclass: †Parareptilia
- Order: †Procolophonomorpha; Romer, 1964

Subgroups
- †Australothyris; †Bolosauria?; †Erpetonyx; †Bolosauridae; †Ankyramorpha; †Microleter?; †Lanthanosuchoidea; †Procolophonia

= Procolophonomorpha =

Procolophonomorphs Temporal range: Gzhelian - Late Triassic, 306–201.3 Ma

Order of reptiles (fossil)

Procolophonomorpha is a proposed order containing most groups included within the traditional "Parareptilia," a grouping of stem reptiles that is now considered polyphyletic. Procolophonomorpha constitutes a diverse assemblage that includes several lizard-like forms, and more diverse types such as the pareiasaurs, which were considered to be turtle ancestors by earlier studies. Still, this view is no longer considered likely, and there is both molecular and fossil (Pappochelys) evidence for the origin of turtles among diapsid, and more specifically archosauromorph reptiles. The validity of Procolophonomorpha as defined has been debated by recent studies.

== Classification ==
Many papers have applied various definitions to the name, though most of these definitions have since been considered synonymous with clades such as Ankyramorpha and Procolophonia. The current definition of Procolophonomorpha, as defined by Modesto, Scott, & Reisz (2009), is that of a stem-based group containing Procolophon and all taxa more closely related to it than Milleretta.

The following cladogram is simplified after the phylogenetic analysis of MacDougall and Reisz (2014) and shows the placement of Procolophonomorpha within Parareptilia and its interrelationships. Relationships within bolded terminal clades are not shown.

- Parareptilia
  - Mesosaurus
  - - **Millerosauria**
    - **Procolophonomorpha**
      - Australothyris smithi
      - Ankyramorpha
        - Lanthanosuchoidea
          - Feeserpeton oklahomensis
          - - - Colobomycter pholeter
              - Delorhynchus cifellii
            - - Acleistorhinus pteroticus
              - Lanthanosuchus watsoni
        - - Microleter mckinzieorum
          - - Bolosauridae
              - Belebey chengi
              - Eudibamus cursoris
            - Procolophonia
              - Pareiasauromorpha
                - **Nycteroleteridae**
                - **Pareiasauria**
              - - Nyctiphruretidae
                  - Abyssomedon williamsi
                  - Nyctiphruretus acudens
                - Procolophonoidea
                  - **Owenettidae**
                  - **Procolophonidae**
