= Postorbital bone =

Skull bone

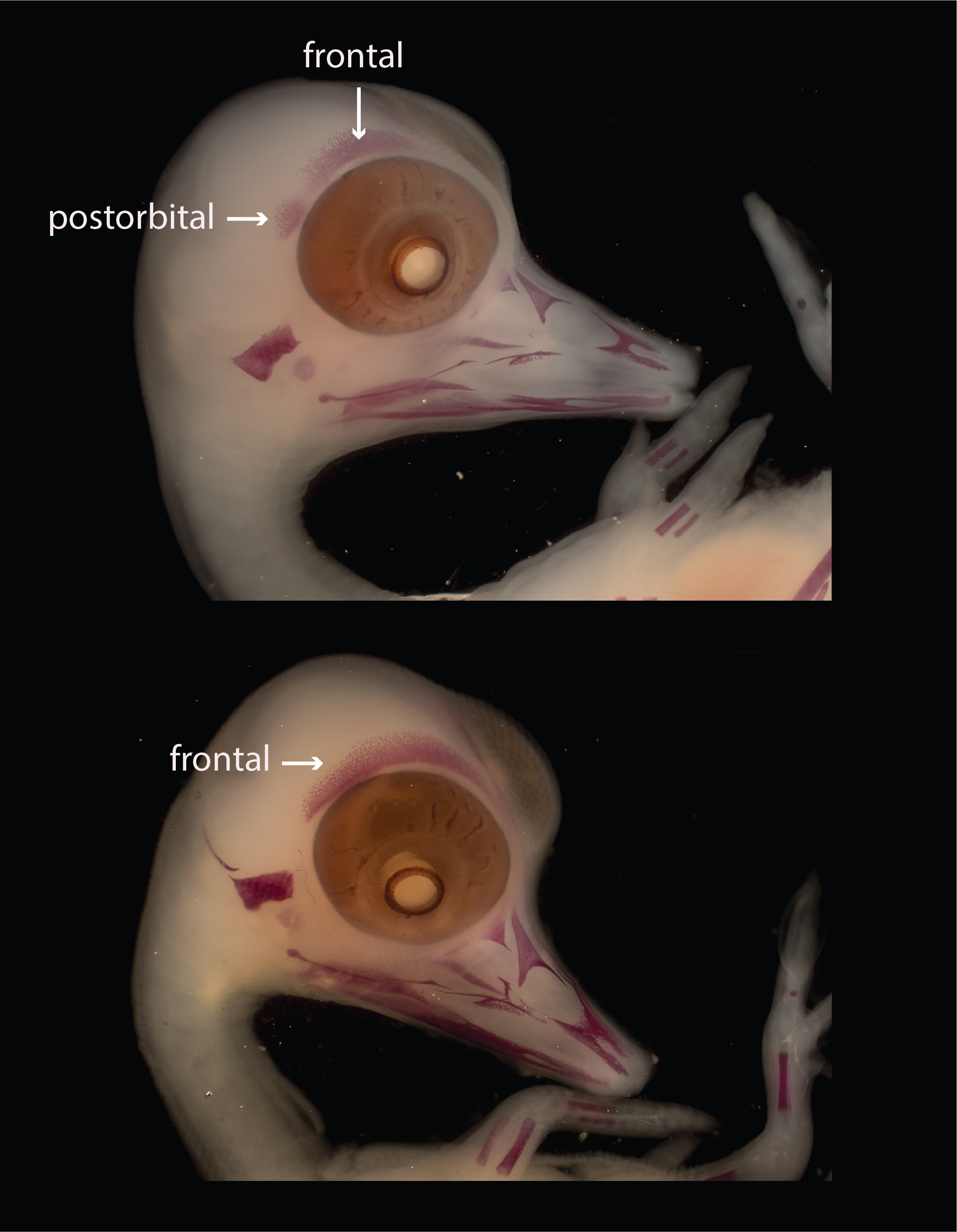
The postorbital of a duck embryo fusing with the frontal during development.

A skull diagram of Dromaeosaurus, a dromaeosaurid dinosaur. The postorbital is colored dark blue.

The postorbital is one of the bones in vertebrate skulls which forms a portion of the dermal skull roof and, sometimes, a ring about the orbit. Generally, it is located behind the postfrontal and posteriorly to the orbital fenestra. In some vertebrates, as geckos, the postorbital is fused with the postfrontal to create a postorbitofrontal. Birds have a separate postorbital as an embryo, but the bone fuses with the frontal before it hatches.
