= Postfrontal bone =

Skull of the tuatara (Sphenodon punctatus), with the postfrontal bone labeled in tan

The postfrontal is a paired cranial bone found in many tetrapods. It occupies an area of the skull roof between and behind the orbits (eye sockets), lateral to the frontal and parietal bones, and anterior to the postorbital bone.

The postfrontal forms part of the rear and upper border of the eye socket when present. It is particularly large in many extinct amphibians and their sarcopterygian (lobe-finned fish) ancestors, stretching forwards to contact the prefrontal, thus separating the frontal from the rim of the orbit. In living amphibians (lissamphibians), the postfrontal is absent, having failed to ossify during development. The postfrontal is present but reduced in some reptiles, including modern squamates (lizards and snakes). It is lost or fused to surrounding bones in mammals, crocodylomorphs (including crocodilians) and dinosaurs (including birds), though it is present in other extinct archosaurs. In geckos, it fuses to the postorbital to form the postorbitofrontal.
