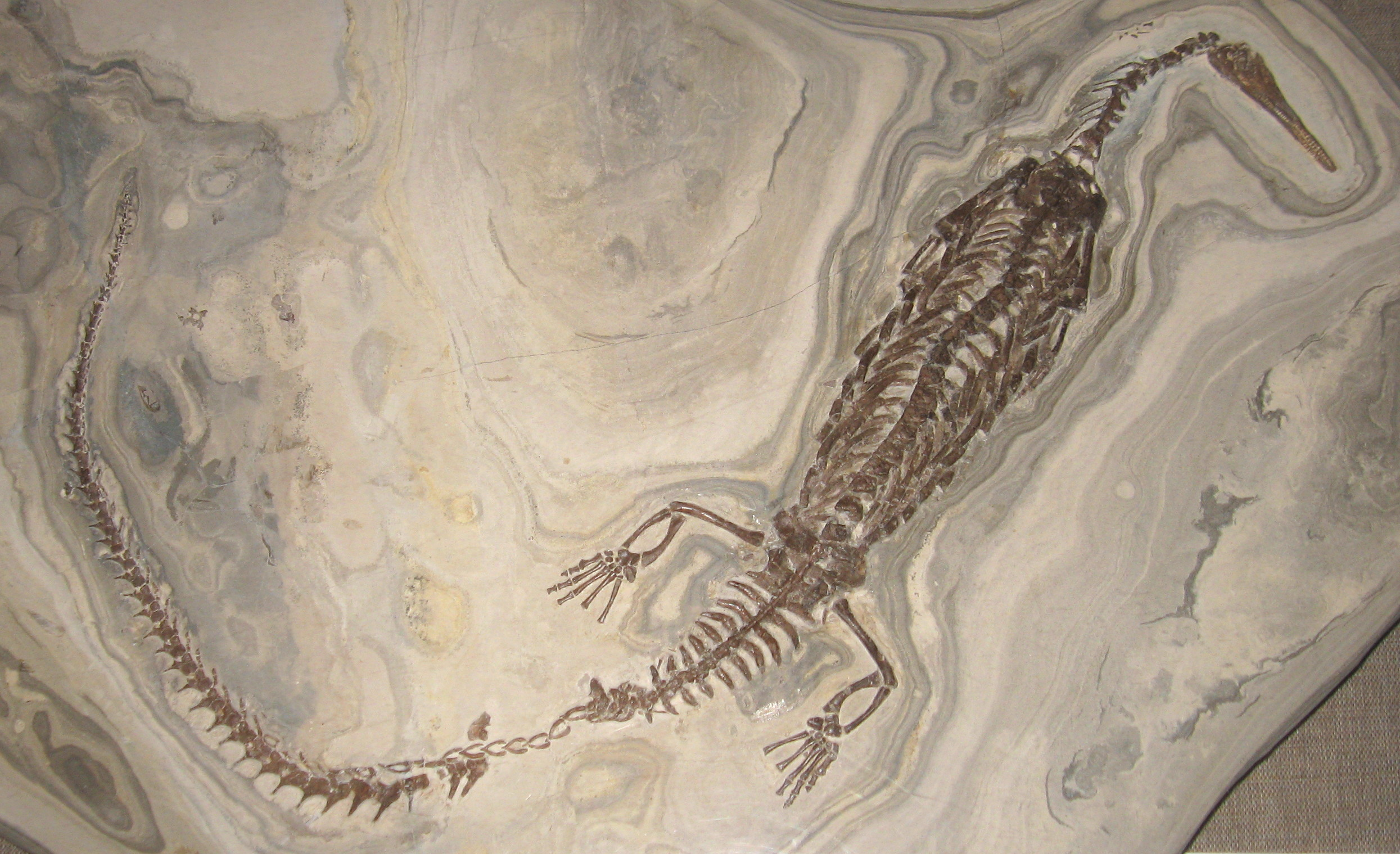

Scientific classification
- Kingdom: Animalia
- Phylum: Chordata
- Clade: Sauropsida
- Order: †Mesosauria; Seeley, 1892
- Family: †Mesosauridae; Baur, 1889
- Genus: †Mesosaurus; Gervais, 1865
- Species: †M. tenuidens

Binomial name
- †Mesosaurus tenuidens Gervais, 1865

Synonyms
- List: Mesosaurus brasiliensis McGregor, 1908; Ditrochosaurus capensis Gurich, 1889; Mesosaurus capensis (Gurich, 1889); Brazilosaurus sanpauloensis Shikama & Ozaki, 1966; Stereosternum tumidum Cope, 1885; Mesosaurus tumidum Cope, 1885

= Mesosaurus =

Mesosaurus Temporal range: Early Permian Kungurian

Extinct genus of reptile from the early Permian of South Africa

Mesosaurus (meaning "middle lizard") is an extinct genus of marine reptile from the late Early Permian (Kungurian, ~275 million years ago) of southern Africa and South America. It is the only member of the family Mesosauridae and order Mesosauria. Two other genera of mesosaurs, Brazilosaurus and Stereosternum, were formerly recognised, but are now considered synonyms of Mesosaurus. Mesosaurus contains a single valid species, M. tenuidens. Mesosaurus represents one of the earliest lineages of aquatically adapted reptiles. It had many adaptations to a fully aquatic lifestyle, including pachyosteosclerotic (dense and thick) bones and webbed feet. Mesosaurus lived around the shorelines (including at least sometimes in coastal lagoons) of the Irati–Whitehill sea, an epicontinental sea that covered parts of southern Pangaea during the late Early Permian, likely feeding on small prey, with pygocephalomorph crustaceans in particular likely forming a large part of its diet. The findings of mesosaurs on both sides of the Atlantic led Alfred Wegener to use them as evidence for his proposed theory of continental drift and the existence of Pangaea. The relationships of Mesosaurus to other reptiles has been debated, having often been historically considered parareptiles, though the validity of "Parareptilia" has recently been brought into question. Recent studies regardless place mesosaurs as relatively basal (early-diverging), non-diapsid reptiles.

== Discovery and naming ==
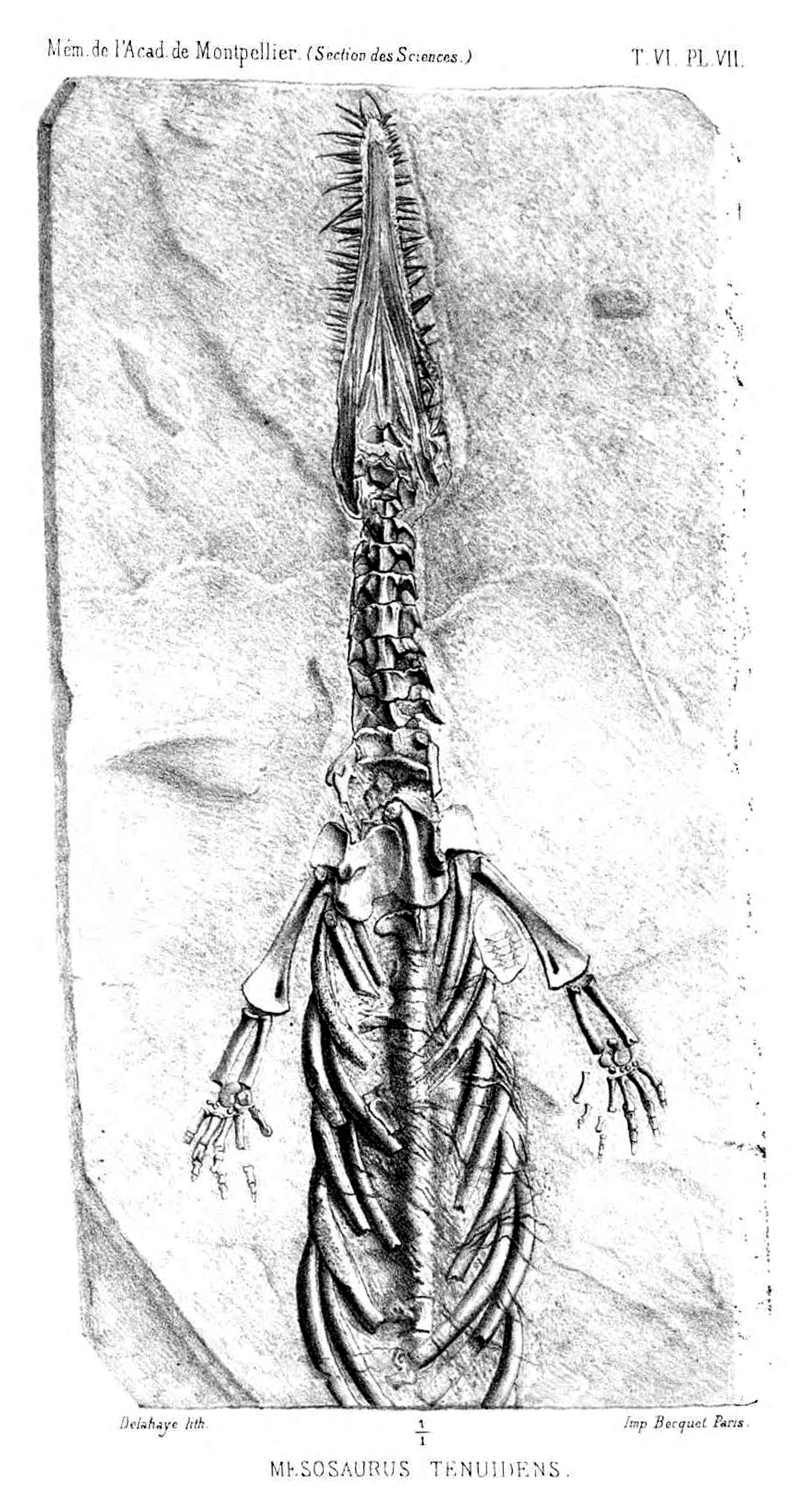
Drawing of the holotype of Mesosaurus tenuidens (specimen MNHN 1865–77)

The holotype of M. tenuidens, MNHN 1865–77, is nicknamed the "Griqua Mesosaurus" and it was found in a Griqua hut in South Africa, likely in Kimberley, Northern Cape around 1830 and was being used as a pot lid. The circumstances of its discovery and how it was taken from its previous owners in South Africa are unknown, but what is known is that the specimen eventually surfaced in the collection of the French palaeontologist Paul Gervais during the 1860s and he designated it as the holotype of a new genus and species he named Mesosaurus tenuidens in 1865. In 1889, the species Ditchrosaurus capensis was named by Georg Gürich based on remains found in South Africa, though this is now regarded as a synonym of M. tenuidens. Since then, Mesosaurus remains have also been identified from South America and were first identified in 1908 as belonging to a second species, M. brasiliensis, by J. H. MacGregor. Later studies have shown that M. brasiliensis is another synonym of M. tenuidens.

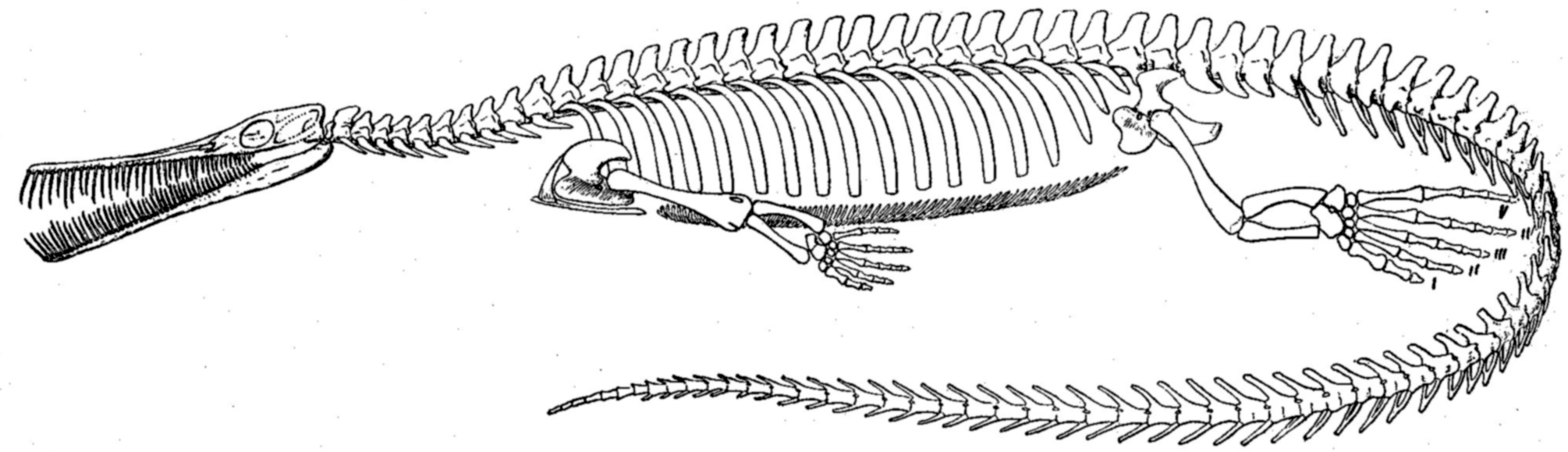
Historic reconstruction of the skeleton of Mesosaurus from 1908

Two other species of mesosaurs have been described and historically considered valid; Stereosternum tumidum and Brazilosaurus sanpauloensis. Stereosternum tumidum was named by Edward Drinker Cope in 1886, based on specimens he studied while Brazil, in the collections of the Museu Nacional (Rio de Janeiro). Brazilosaurus is known from specimen BSPG 1965 I 131, a single skeleton recovered from the Assistencia Member of the Irati Formation (Hanayama Farm, Tatuí, São Paulo), in the Paraná Basin. It was named by T. Shikama and H. Ozaki in 1966.

Stereosternum, Brazilosaurus & Mesosaurus were historically regarded as valid genera, distinguished by the shape of their teeth. However, recent studies have suggested that the teeth actually changed shape of the course of growth, and that only Mesosaurus is actually a valid genus, with the other two genera representing juvenile or fragmentary specimens of Mesosaurus, and that M. tenuidens represents the only valid mesosaur species.

== Description ==
Scale diagram of Mesosaurus specimens

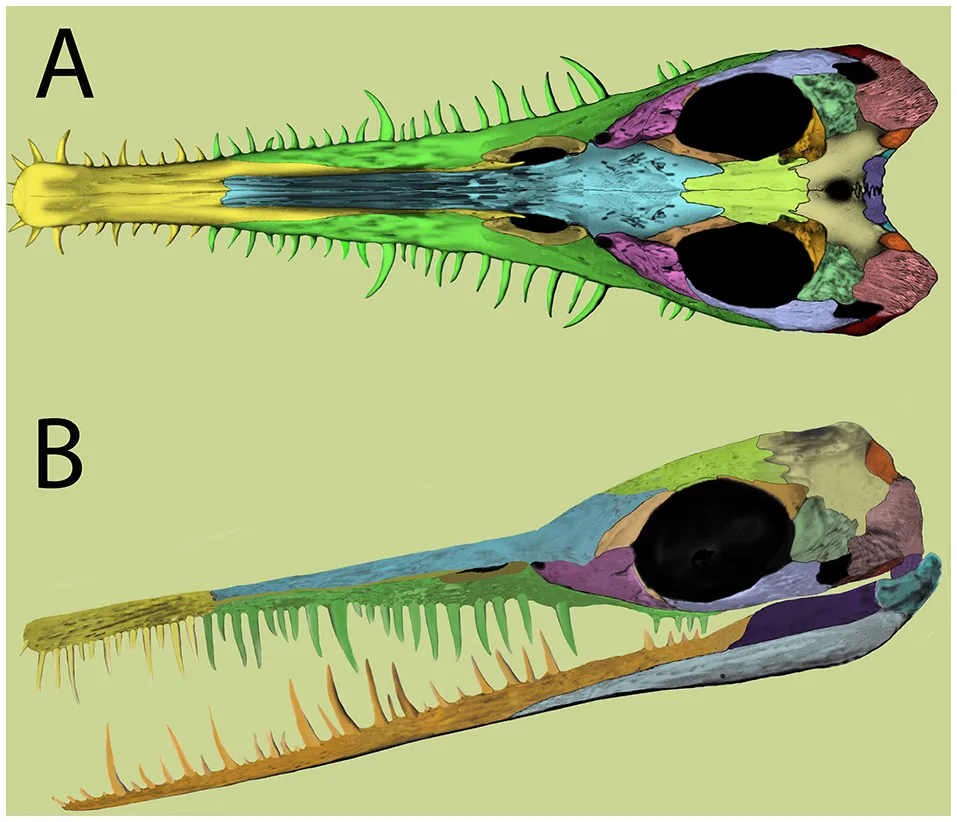
Skull diagram

Mesosaurs have been described as small-medium-sized reptiles, with hatchlings around 10–12 centimetres (3.9–4.7 in) long, and young adult specimens around 80–90 centimetres (31–35 in) in length, with most collected specimens being around 70 centimetres (28 in). The largest known individuals are estimated to have reached a length of 1.5 to 2.5 metres (59 to 98 in), though such specimens are rare as fossils, perhaps because large individuals had different environmental preferences than younger individuals.

The bodies of mesosaurs are slender with an elongate tail, which was proportionally narrow from side to side. The bones exhibit pachyosteosclerosis (the property of being both thick and relatively dense). The limbs are paddle-like, with preserved soft tissue from some individuals indicating that the feet were webbed. Mesosaurus is unusual among reptiles in that it possesses a cleithrum, usually found in more primitive bony fish and tetrapods. The head of the interclavicle of Mesosaurus is triangular, unlike those of other early reptiles, which are diamond-shaped.

The rostrum (the front part of the skull) is relatively elongate and the jaws exhibit numerous slender, conical teeth, which underwent replacement, as well as palatal teeth at the roof of the mouth. Mesosaurus possessed a smooth enamel-dentine junction, reflecting its enamel being solely formed by cells of the ectoderm. The nostrils were located at the top, allowing the creature to breathe with only the upper side of its head breaking the surface, in a similar manner to a modern crocodile. The back of the skull exhibits a single pair of lower temporal fenetestrae. Over the course of growth, the skull became proportionally shorter though the proportion made up by the snout increased due to elongation, the teeth became more elongate and the hindlimb and the forelimb hand (manus) became proportionally shorter.

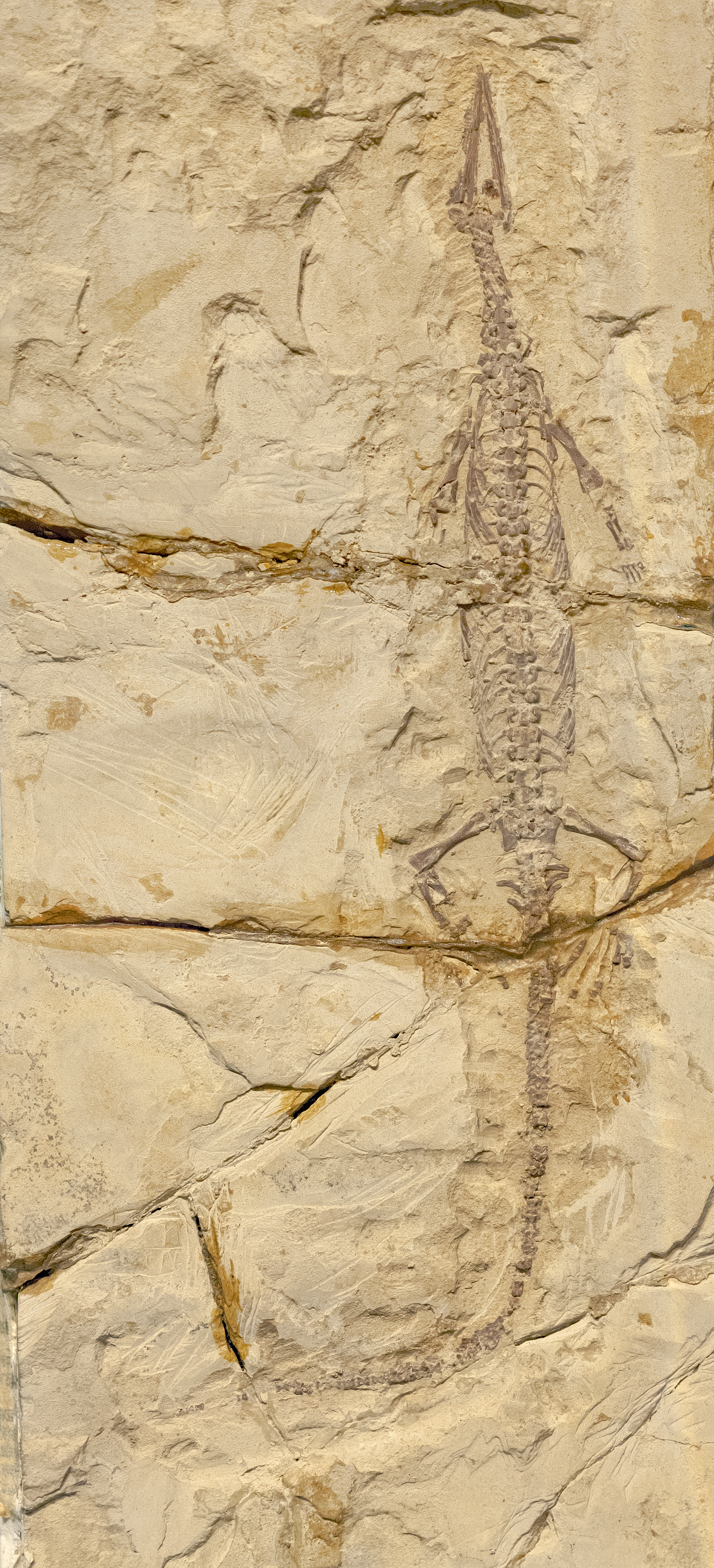
Fossil from Brazil

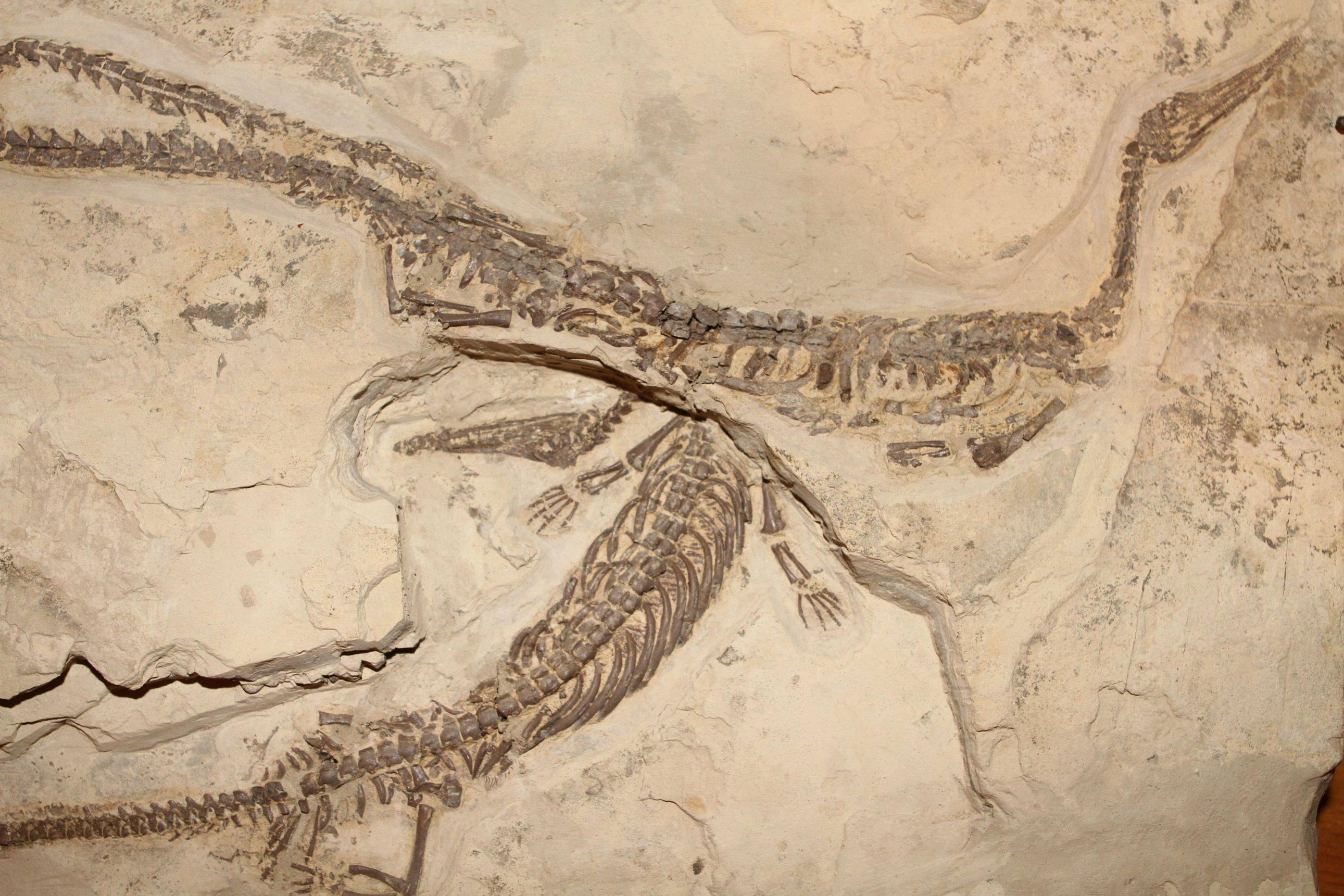
Dual fossil in Louisiana

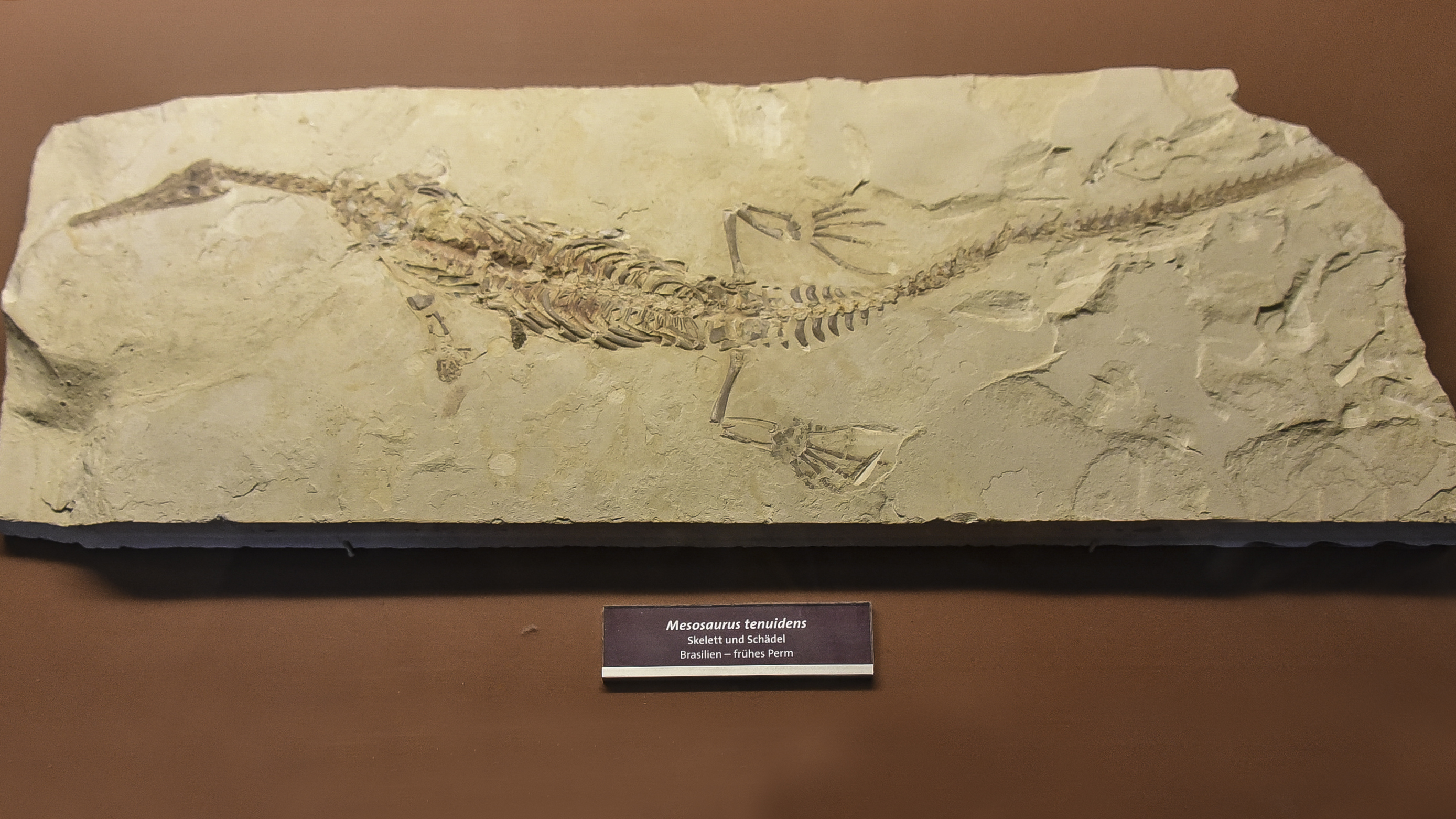
From Brazil, at the Natural History Museum, Vienna

== Palaeobiology ==
=== Diet ===
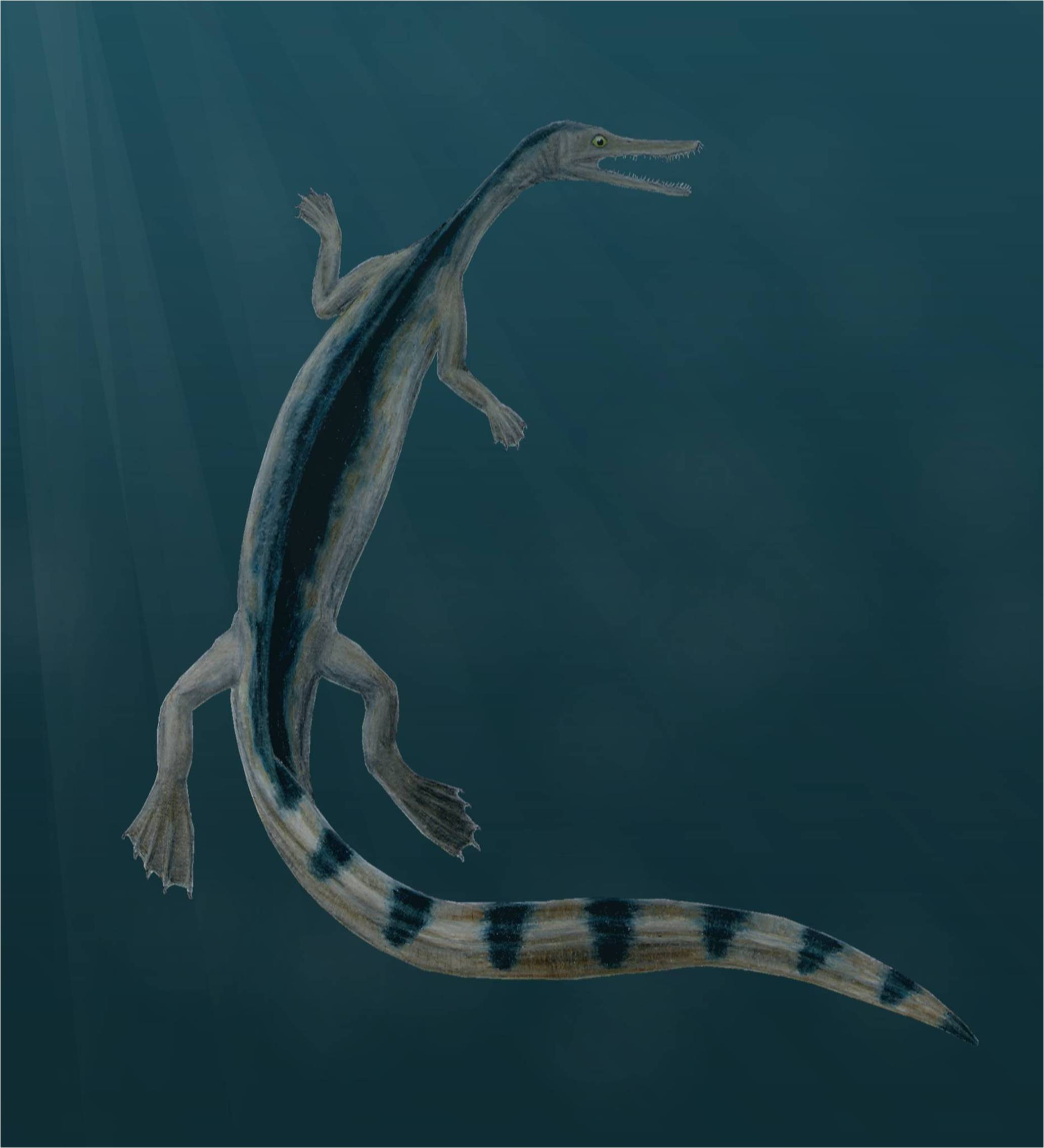
Life restoration of Mesosaurus

Mesosaurus had a small skull with long jaws. The teeth were originally thought to have been straining devices for the filter feeding of planktonic organisms. However, this idea was based on the assumption that the teeth of Mesosaurus were numerous and close together in the jaws. Newly examined remains of Mesosaurus show that it had fewer teeth and that the dentition was suitable for catching small (under 2 centimetres (0.79 in) in length) nektonic prey such as crustaceans, specifically those belonging to the extinct order Pygocephalomorpha, which were abundant in the environment in which Mesosaurus lived (which are otherwise scarce in fossils) and have been found in coprolites (fossilised feces) attributed to Mesosaurus. Mesosaurus may also have engaged in cannibalism, based on remains of juvenile mesosaurs found in coprolites and regurgitates attributed to mesosaurs. These however may be a result of scavenging rather than active predation.

=== Locomotion ===
Mesosaurus was one of the first reptiles known to have returned to the water after early tetrapods came to land in the Late Devonian or later in the Paleozoic. It was around 1 metre (3.3 ft) in length, with webbed feet, a streamlined body, and a long tail that may have supported a fin. It probably propelled itself through the water with its long hind legs and flexible tail. Its body was also flexible and could easily move sideways, but it had heavily thickened ribs, which would have prevented it from twisting its body. The pachyostosis seen in the bones of Mesosaurus may have enabled it to reach neutral buoyancy in the upper few meters of the water column. The additional weight may have stabilized the animal at the water's surface. Alternatively, it could have given Mesosaurus greater momentum when gliding underwater. Biomechanical analysis of its body suggests that Mesosaurus would have been a relatively slow swimmer, with its optimal swimming speed in both hypersaline water and seawater most likely being between 0.15 and 0.41 m/s.

While many features suggest a wholly aquatic lifestyle, Mesosaurus may have been able to move onto land for short periods of time. Its elbows and ankles were restricted in their movement, making walking appear impossible. It is more likely that if Mesosaurus moved onto land, it would push itself forward in a similar way to living female sea turtles when nesting on beaches. A study on vertebral column proportions suggested that, while young Mesosaurus might have been fully aquatic, adult animals spent some time on land. This is supported by the rarity of adult animals in aquatic settings, and a coprolite possessing drying fractures. However, how terrestrial these animals were is difficult to say, as their pachyostosis and other adaptations for an aquatic lifestyle would have made foraging on land difficult. Other scholars have contested the idea that adult mesosaurs were more terrestrially adapted than juveniles, and have suggested that they may have spent more time in open water.

=== Reproduction ===
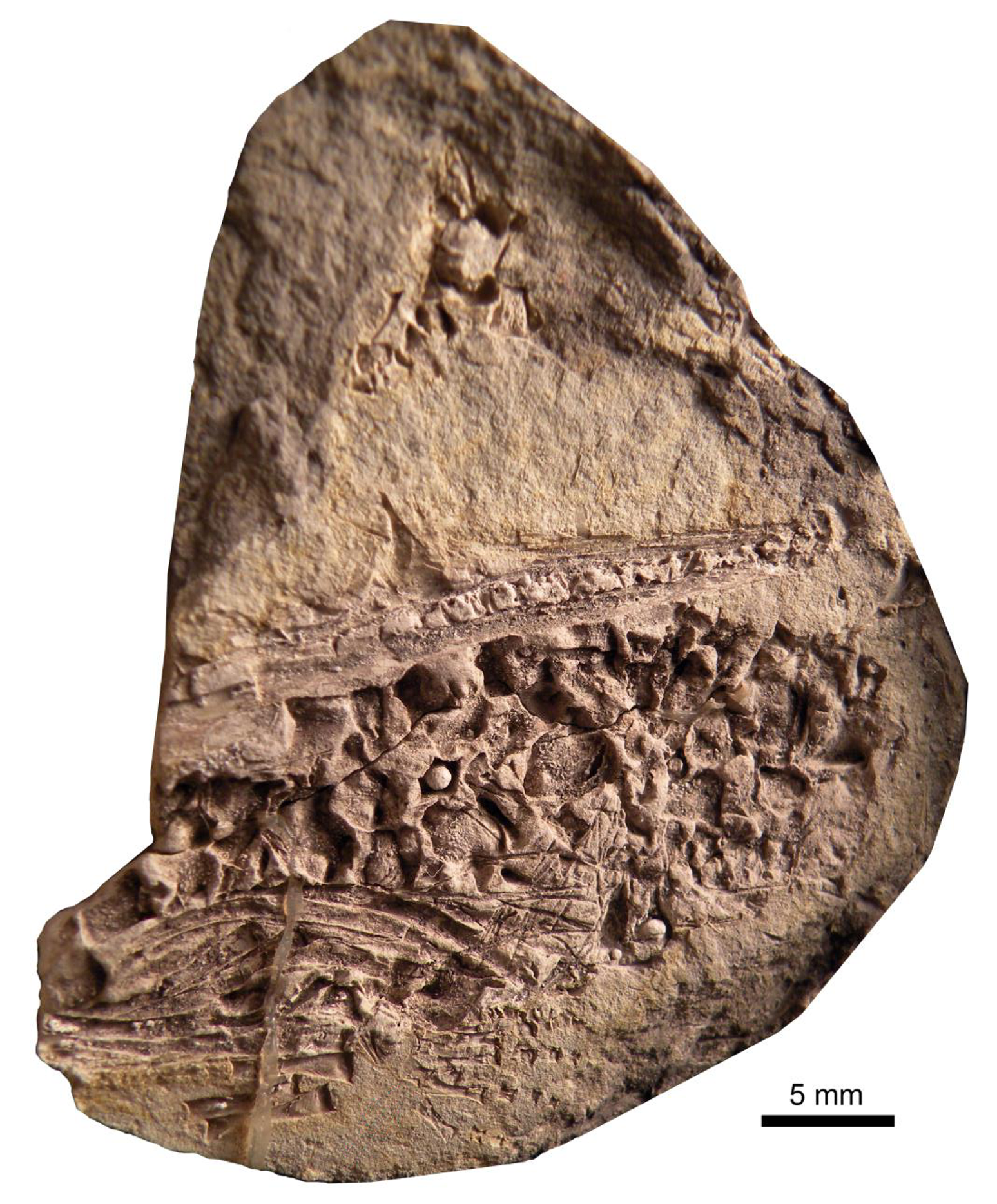
Fossil of unhatched juvenile or fetus of Mesosaurus (FC-DPV 2504) from Uruguay

Clearly amniote-type fossil embryos of Mesosaurus in an advanced stage of development (i.e. fetuses) have been discovered in Uruguay and Brazil. These fossils are the earliest record of amniote fetuses, although amniotes are inferred to have had their typical reproductive strategy since their first appearance in the Late Carboniferous. Prior to their description, the oldest known amniote fetuses were from the Triassic.

One isolated coiled fetus called FC-DPV 2504 is not surrounded by calcareous eggshells, suggesting that the glands in the oviduct of Mesosaurus and probably all Paleozoic amniotes were not able to secrete calcium carbonate, in contrast to post-paleozoic archosaurs. This would explain the scarcity of egg fossils in the paleozoic amniote fossil record.

One Mesosaurus specimen called MCN-PV 2214 comprises a medium-size adult with a small individual in its rib cage which is interpreted as a fetus 'in utero', even suggesting that Mesosaurus like many other marine reptiles, gave live birth. If this interpretation is correct, this specimen would represent the earliest known example of viviparity in the fossil record. The isolated fetus FC-DPV 2504, however, rather points to an ovoviviparous reproduction strategy in Mesosaurus.

== Distribution and habitat ==
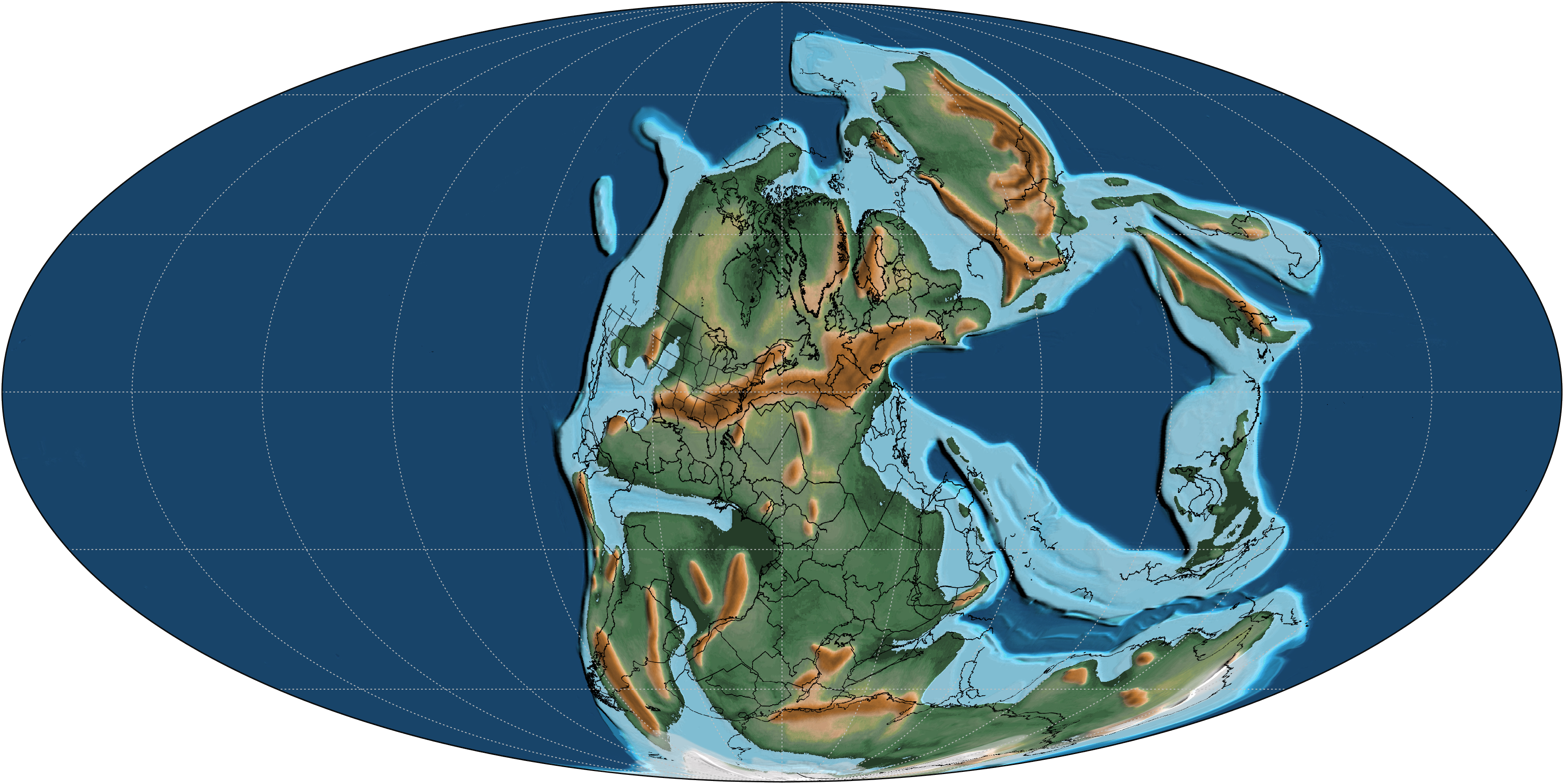
Map of Earth during the Kungurian stage of the late Early Permian (Cisuralian) c. 275 million years ago, showing the Irati–Whitehill sea covering parts of southern Africa and eastern South America at the bottom of the map near the South Pole

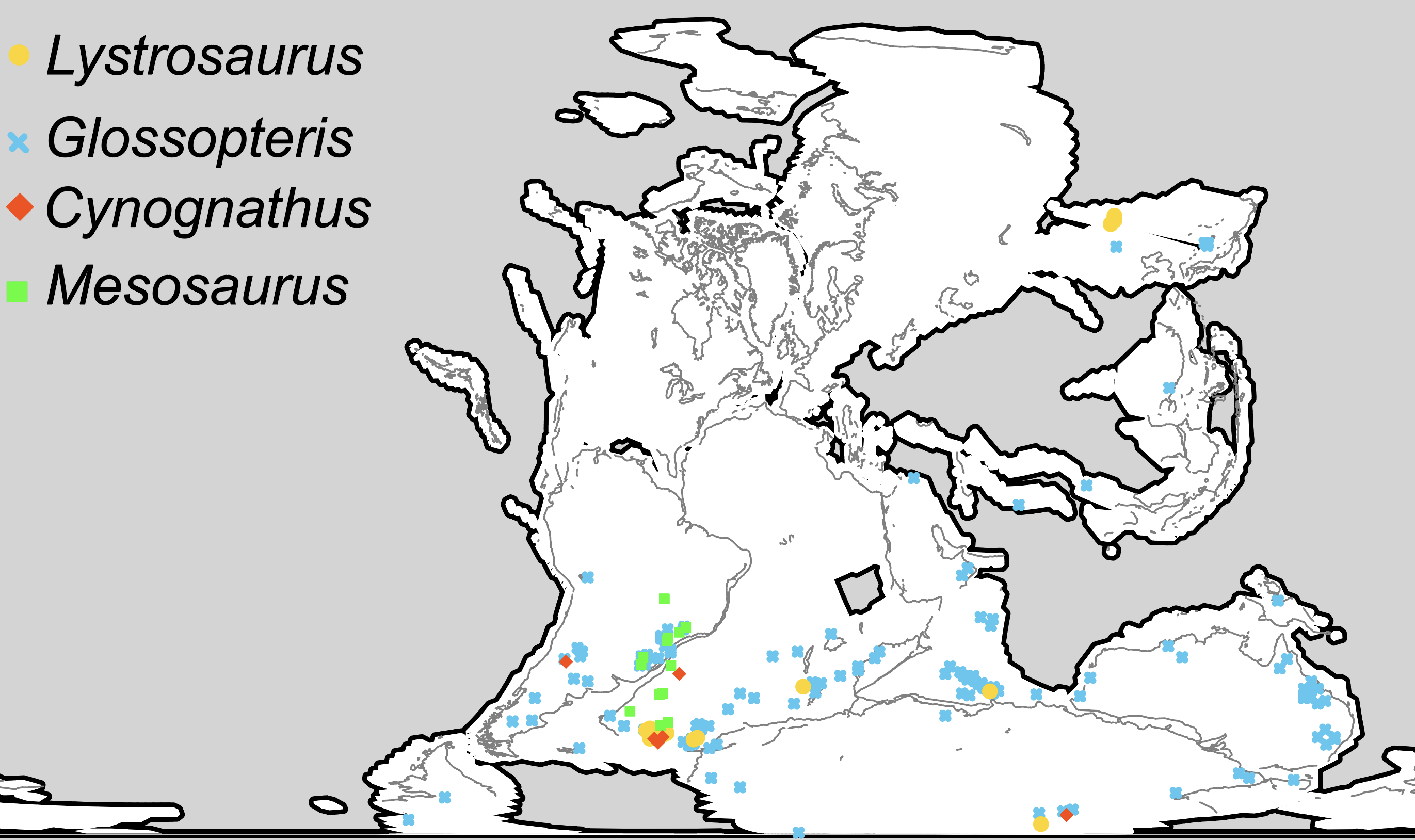
Location of Mesosaurus fossils (green points) with map showing formerly adjacent position in Pangaea.

Mesosaurus remains have been found in southern Africa, (Whitehill Formation), and eastern South America (Mangrullo Formation, Uruguay and Irati Formation, Brazil), today two widely separated regions. The existence of Mesosaurus fossils on both sides of the Atlantic were used by Alfred Wegener as evidence of his theory of continental drift. Mesosaurus lived on the coastline of the Irati–Whitehill sea, an epicontinental sea that existed in the southern part of Gondwanan Pangaea covering parts of south and eastern South America and southern Africa during the Early Permian for a period of up to 4 million years during the late Kungurian age of the Early Permian, around 275 million years ago, before drying up, resulting the extinction of the mesosaurs. At least some mesosaurs, like those from the Mangrullo Formation, are suggested to have lived in saline lagoons with anoxic bottom waters that had a relatively depauperate fauna dominated by mesosaurs and pygocephalomorph crustaceans, with otherwise common aquatic animals like fish and temnospondyl amphibians being absent from the lagoons.

== Relationships to other reptiles ==
The phylogenetic position of mesosaurs has historically had an important bearing on the definition of Reptilia. In one of the first major phylogenetic studies of amniotes (vertebrates laying eggs on land) Gauthier et al. (1988) placed Mesosauridae in a group called Parareptilia. Parareptilia means "at the side of reptiles" and was placed outside the clade Reptilia, which was considered a crown group. As a crown group, Reptilia included the most recent common ancestor of the then believed to be the two main lineages of living reptiles – anapsids (specifically Testudines) and diapsids (all other living reptiles) – and all descendants of that common ancestor. This view of placing turtles outside of diapsids is now outdated and the majority of modern paleontologists believe that the Testudines (turtles and allies) are descended from diapsid reptiles that lost their temporal fenestrae. More recent morphological phylogenetic studies with this in mind placed turtles firmly within diapsids, and, more commonly, as a sister taxon to Archosauria (made up of crocodiles, dinosaurs – including birds – and allies). Furthermore, Anapsida is rarely considered a valid clade in recent phylogenetic analyses. In this sense, Reptilia was a node-based taxon because the first reptilian common ancestor would have been a "node" on the phylogenetic tree. Under this phylogeny, many extinct forms traditionally regarded as reptiles including mesosaurs were excluded from the group because they were outside the node.

Cladogram after Gauthier et al. 1988:

- Amniota
  - Synapsida
  - - †Parareptilia
      - †Mesosauridae
      - - †Procolophonia
        - - †Millerettidae
          - †Pareiasauria
    - Reptilia
      - Anapsida
        - †Captorhinidae
        - Testudines
      - Romeriida
        - †Paleothyris
        - Diapsida
          - †Araeoscelidia
          - Sauria

The study of Laurin and Reisz (1995) was the second major phylogenetic analysis of amniotes. Like Gauthier et al., Laurin and Reisz used Reptilia as a crown group and placed mesosaurs outside the group. Their phylogeny differed in that the parareptiles of Gauthier et al. were now regarded as close relatives of turtles, within crown group Reptilia. Laurin and Reisz adopted the name Sauropsida as a node-based taxon including the last common ancestor of mesosaurs and Reptilia. Traditionally, amniotes are divided into two groups: a mammal lineage called Synapsida and a reptile lineage called either Reptilia or Sauropsida. In fact, the study of Gauthier (1994) defined Sauropsida as all amniotes more closely related to reptiles than to mammals, which meant that Sauropsida was a stem-based taxon encompassing the entire reptilian lineage or reptilian "stem" of Amniota (Synapsida was the mammalian stem). Under this phylogeny, the only group that prevents Sauropsida from being equivalent to Reptilia is mesosaurs.

Cladogram after Laurin and Reisz, 1995:

- Amniota
  - Synapsida
  - Sauropsida
    - †Mesosauridae
    - Reptilia
      - Anapsida
        - †Millerettidae
        - †Procolophonia
          - †Pareiasauria
          - Testudinomorpha
            - Procolophonidae
            - Testudines
      - Eureptilia
        - †Captorhinidae
        - Romeriida
          - †Paleothyris
          - Diapsida
            - †Araeoscelidia
            - Sauria

More recent phylogenetic analyses, such as that of Modesto (1999), support that of Gauthier et al. (1988) by placing mesosaurs with parareptiles. However, these phylogenies follow Laurin and Reisz (1995) in placing Parareptilia within crown-group Reptilia, meaning that mesosaurs are once again members of Reptilia. Using Laurin and Reisz's node-based definition of Sauropsida as "The last common ancestor of mesosaurs, testudines and diapsids, and all its descendants", Sauropsida and Reptilia are equivalent groupings; mesosaurs and testudines are more closely related to each other than either group is to diapsids,^{[a]} meaning that the clade containing testudines and diapsids (which would be crown-group Reptilia) must also contain mesosaurs. Since Reptilia was named earlier than Sauropsida, it is used most often in modern phylogenetic analyses.

Cladogram after Modesto, 1999

- Amniota
  - Synapsida
  - Reptilia
    - Anapsida
      - †Mesosauridae
      - Parareptilia
        - †Millerettidae
        - Procolophonia
          - †Pareiasauria
          - Testudinomorpha
            - †Procolophonidae
            - Testudines
    - Eureptilia
      - †Captorhinidae
      - Romeriida
        - †Paleothyris
        - Diapsida
          - †Araeoscelidia
          - Sauria

A 2017 phylogenetic analysis by Laurin (who had previously published the 1995 study) and Piñeiro recovered mesosaurs as a basal member of Sauropsida and no longer present within Parareptilia, with Parareptilia being redefined as including former members of Procolophonomorpha (found to be paraphyletic), Millerosauria, Pareiasauria, and Pantestudines, with the latter two being found to be sister groups to one another. Parareptilia was also found to actually nest inside Diapsida as the sister group to Neodiapsida.

Cladogram after Laurin & Piñeiro, 2017:

- Amniota
  - Synapsida
  - Sauropsida
    - †Mesosauridae
    - - †Captorhinidae
      - Diapsida
        - †Araeoscelida
        - - †Paleothyris
          - - Neodiapsida
            - Parareptilia
              - †Acleistorhinidae
              - - †Millerosauria
                - - †Owenettidae
                  - - †Procolophonidae
                    - - †Pareiasauria
                      - Pantestudines

In 2012 it was revealed that Mesosaurus has holes at the back of the skull called lower temporal fenestrae, a characteristic once thought to be present only in synapsids and diapsids. This confirmed the previous results of German paleontologist Friedrich von Huene, already published in 1941 The condition in the skull of Mesosaurus is most similar to that in synapsid skulls because both lack the upper temporal fenestrae of diapsids. Lower temporal fenestrae are so far known only in Mesosaurus, but may be present in all mesosaurs. The presence or absence of temporal fenestrae is an important consideration in the phylogeny of mesosaurs and other amniotes because the three major groups of amniotes -Synapsida, Diapsida, and Anapsida- have been named after the number of holes in their skull; Diapsida means "two arches" in reference to the two bars that close off the upper and lower fenestra, Synapsida means "fused arch" in reference to a single bar at the bottom of the skull closing a single fenestra, and Anapsida means "no arch" in reference to skulls that lack any bars or fenestrae. Mesosaurs were traditionally classified as anapsids because they were thought to have lacked temporal fenestrae. However, the occurrence of fenestrae in amniotes has been recognized a highly variable feature within the group for many years prior to their discovery in Mesosaurus; many anapsids such as Candelaria, Bolosaurus, and lanthanosuchoids possess lower temporal fenestrae.

The skull of a generalized anapsid.

The skull of a generalized synapsid.

The phylogenetic position of mesosaurs influences the current understanding of how amniotes evolved temporal fenestrae. If the phylogeny produced by Laurin and Reisz (1995) is correct in that mesosaurs are basal sauropsids, the lower temporal fenestra may be a primitive feature in amniotes, present in amniote's most recent common ancestor. Synapsids would have retained their fenestrae, and so too would sauropsids except for turtles and most parareptiles. Another possibility under Laurin and Reisz's phylogeny is that lower temporal fenestrae evolved independently in mesosaurs, synapsids, diapsids, and some parareptiles, and that the lack of fenestrae is a primitive feature in amniotes. If instead mesosaurs are members of Parareptilia, the presence of temporal fenestrae is probably not a primitive feature in amniotes, and the lower temporal fenestrae in mesosaurs may be characteristic of a lineage of basal parareptiles that also includes fenestra-bearing lanthanosuchoids and Bolosaurus.

Later research during the early 2020s questioned the validity of "Parareptilia", finding it to be a paraphyletic group, and questioned the placement of mesosaurs at the base of Sauropsida. Jenkins et al. 2025 placed Mesosauridae within the clade Neoreptilia. Cladogram based on that study below. Orange bars denotes taxa traditionally considered part of Parareptilia:

- Sauropsida
  - †Araeoscelidia
  - - †Bolosauridae
    - Neoreptilia
      - †Ankyramorpha
        - †Acleistorhinidae
        - - †Pareiasauromorpha
          - †Procolophonoidea
      - - †Mesosauridae
          †Mesosaurus
        - - - †Cabarzia
            - - †Ascendonanus
              - †Orovenator
          - Parapleurota
            - †Millerettidae
            - Neodiapsida
              - †Younginidae
              - - †Tangasauridae
                - - †Weigeltisauridae
                  - - †Claudiosaurus
                    - Sauria
                      - Lepidosauromorpha
                      - Archosauromorpha
