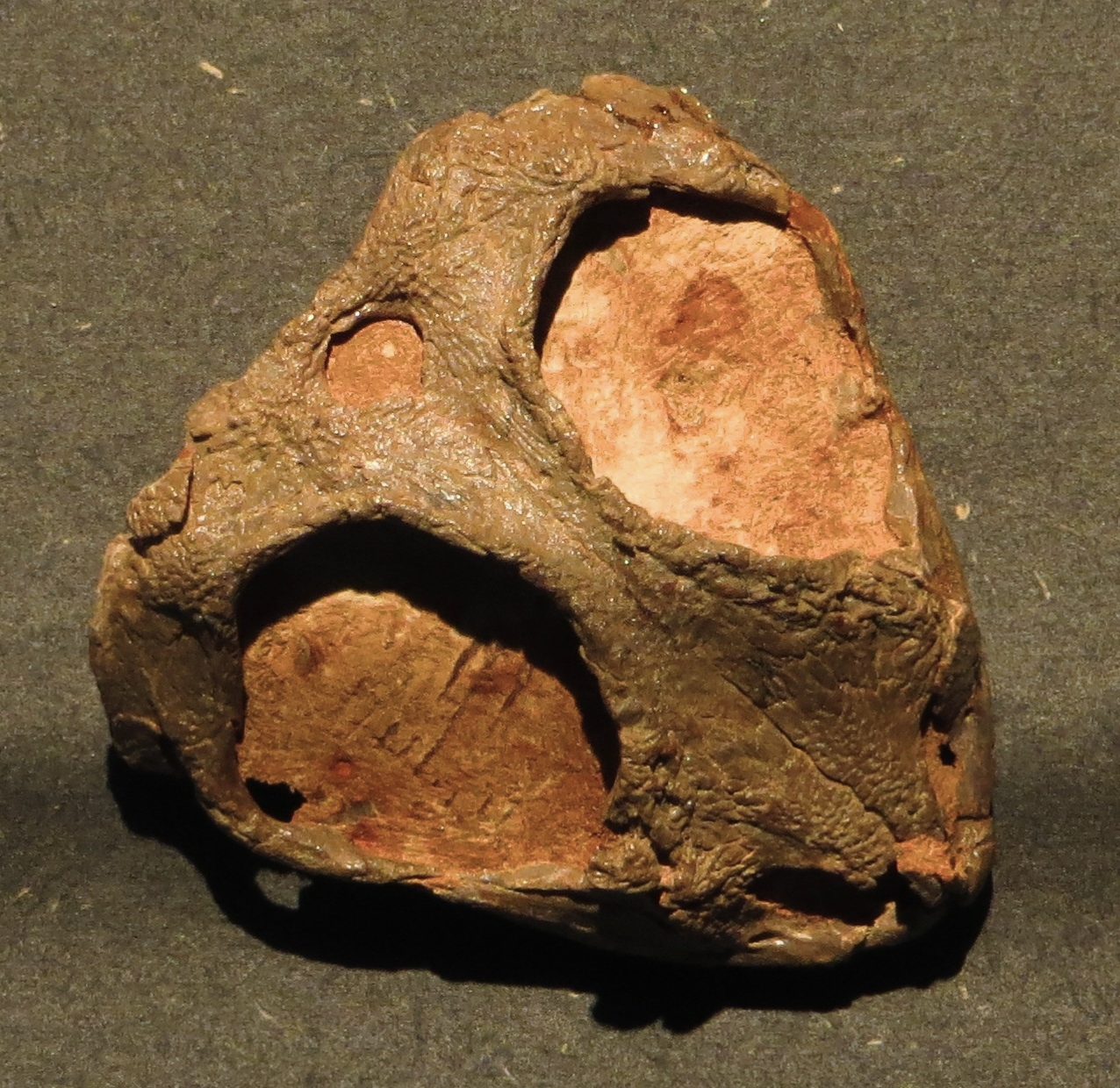
- PIN 4659/1, the best preserved fossil skull of Nyctiphruretus acudens

Scientific classification
- Kingdom: Animalia
- Phylum: Chordata
- Class: Reptilia
- Family: †Nyctiphruretidae
- Genus: †Nyctiphruretus; Efremov, 1938

Species
- †N. acudens Efremov, 1938 (type); †N. optabilis Bulanov, 2002

= Nyctiphruretus =

Nyctiphruretus Temporal range: Guadalupian, 273–265 Ma

Extinct genus of reptiles

Nyctiphruretus (meaning "Guardian of the Night") is an extinct genus of nyctiphruretid known from the Guadalupian series (middle Permian) of European Russia.

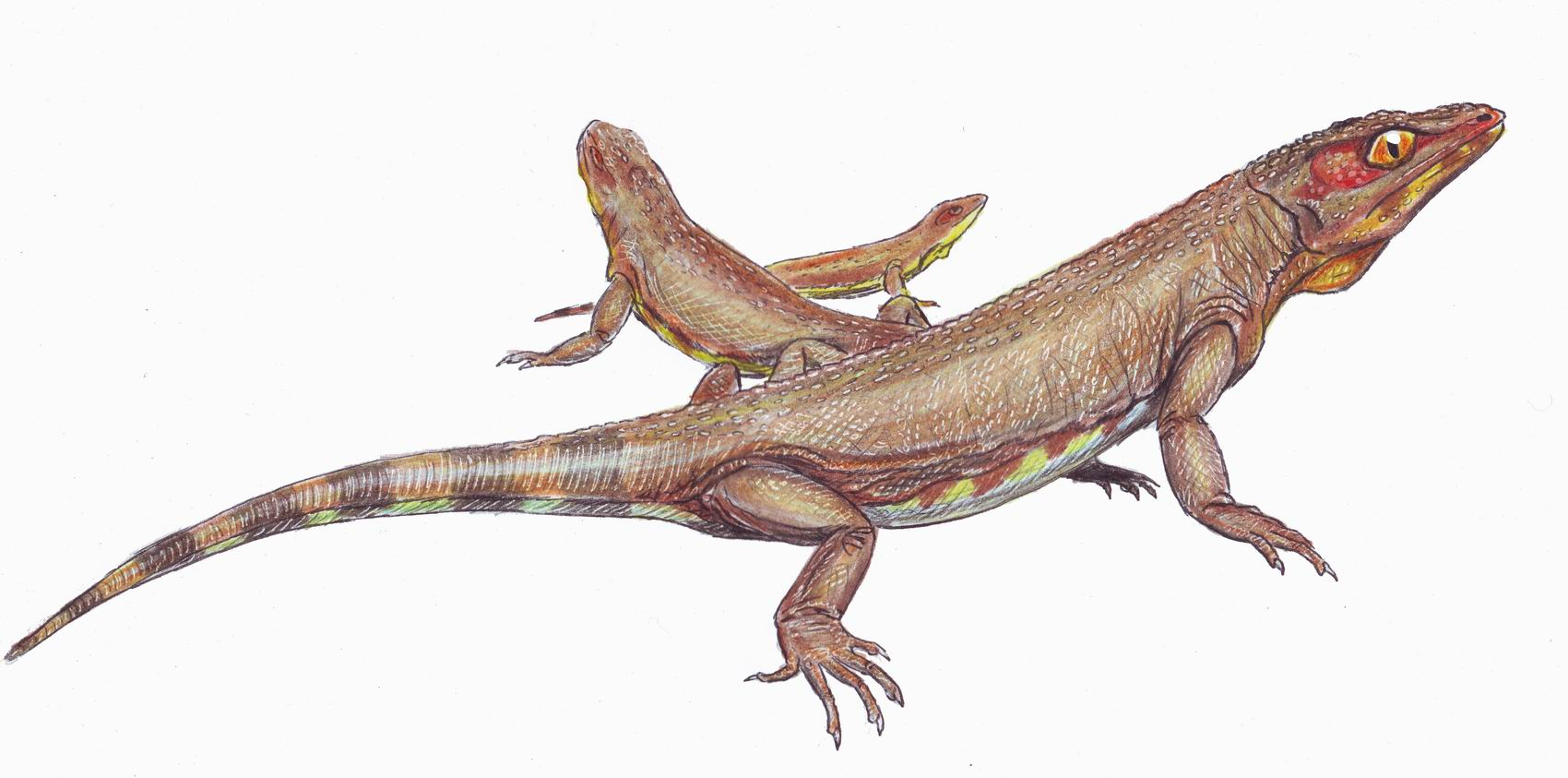
Life restoration of three Nyctiphruretus acudens.

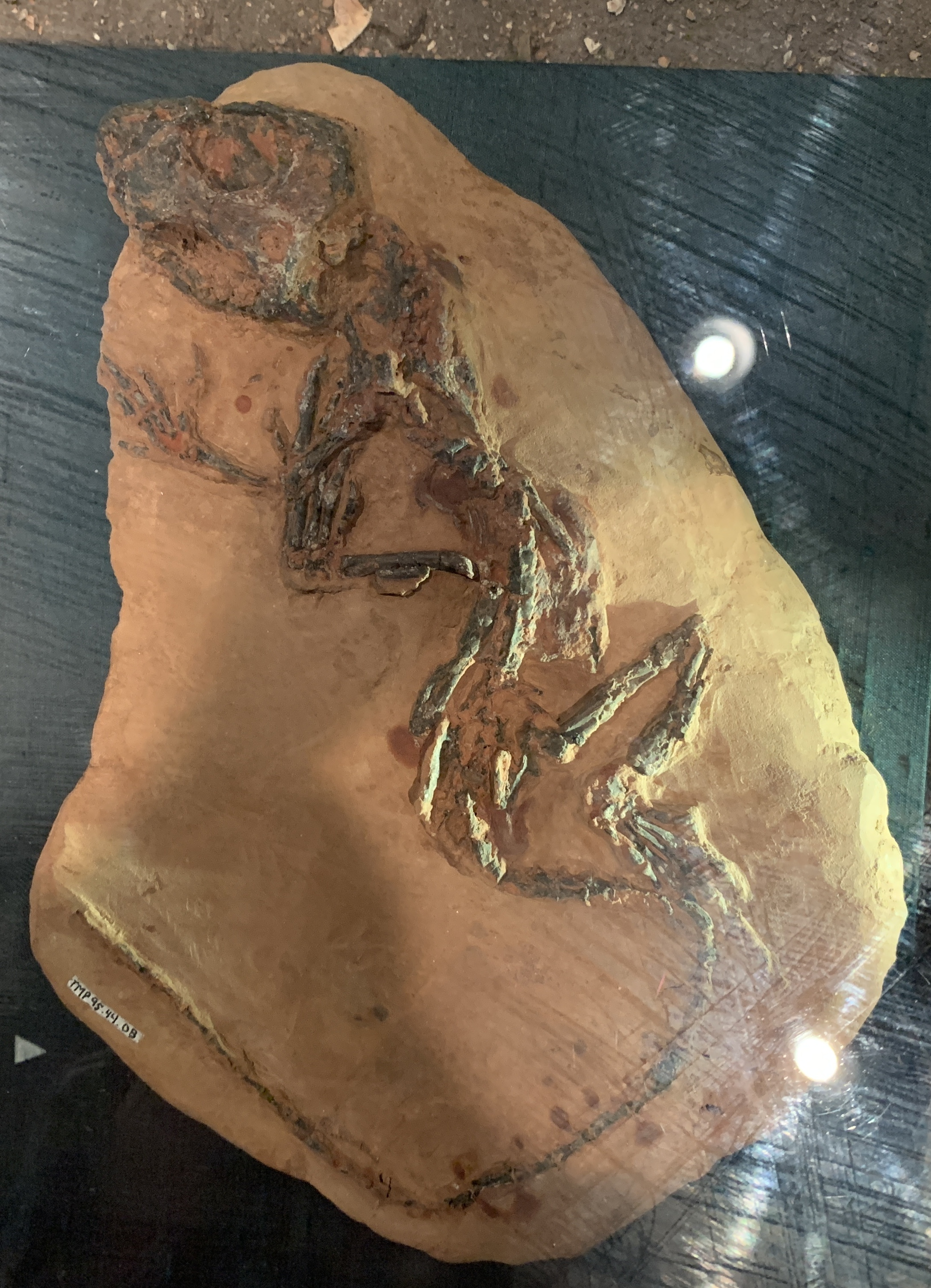
At the Royal Tyrrell Museum of Palaeontology.

Many fossils of the type species, N. acudens, were found well preserved near the Mezen River of European Russia in various stages of growth. The dentition identified that Nyctiphruretus is a herbivore. Based on the large numbers of individuals found and the sediment that they were found in, it appears that their diet consisted of aquatic plants. Adults discovered averaged 36 cm in length with a 4.4 cm skull that was crushed but recognisable. Nyctiphruretus was first named by Efremov in 1938 and the type species is Nyctiphruretus acudens. In 2002, a second species was named by V. V. Bulanov. N. optabilis is known from a single jaw, also from Russia, Eastern Europe.

Lee (1997) named the order Nyctiphruretia and the family Nyctiphruretidae, to include Nyctiphruretus. While the family was defined to be monotypic, the order was defined to include both nyctiphruretids and nycteroleterids. However, recent cladistic analyses suggest that nycteroleterids are more closely related to the Pareiasauria instead, thus making Nyctiphruretus the only genus of its order. In 2014, MacDougall & Reisz described and named a second genus of Nyctiphruretidae, Abyssomedon, from the middle Leonardian stage of the late Early Permian of Comanche County, Oklahoma, south-central United States. It contains a single species, A. williamsi, which represents the first nyctiphruretid known from North America, and the oldest species of the family.
