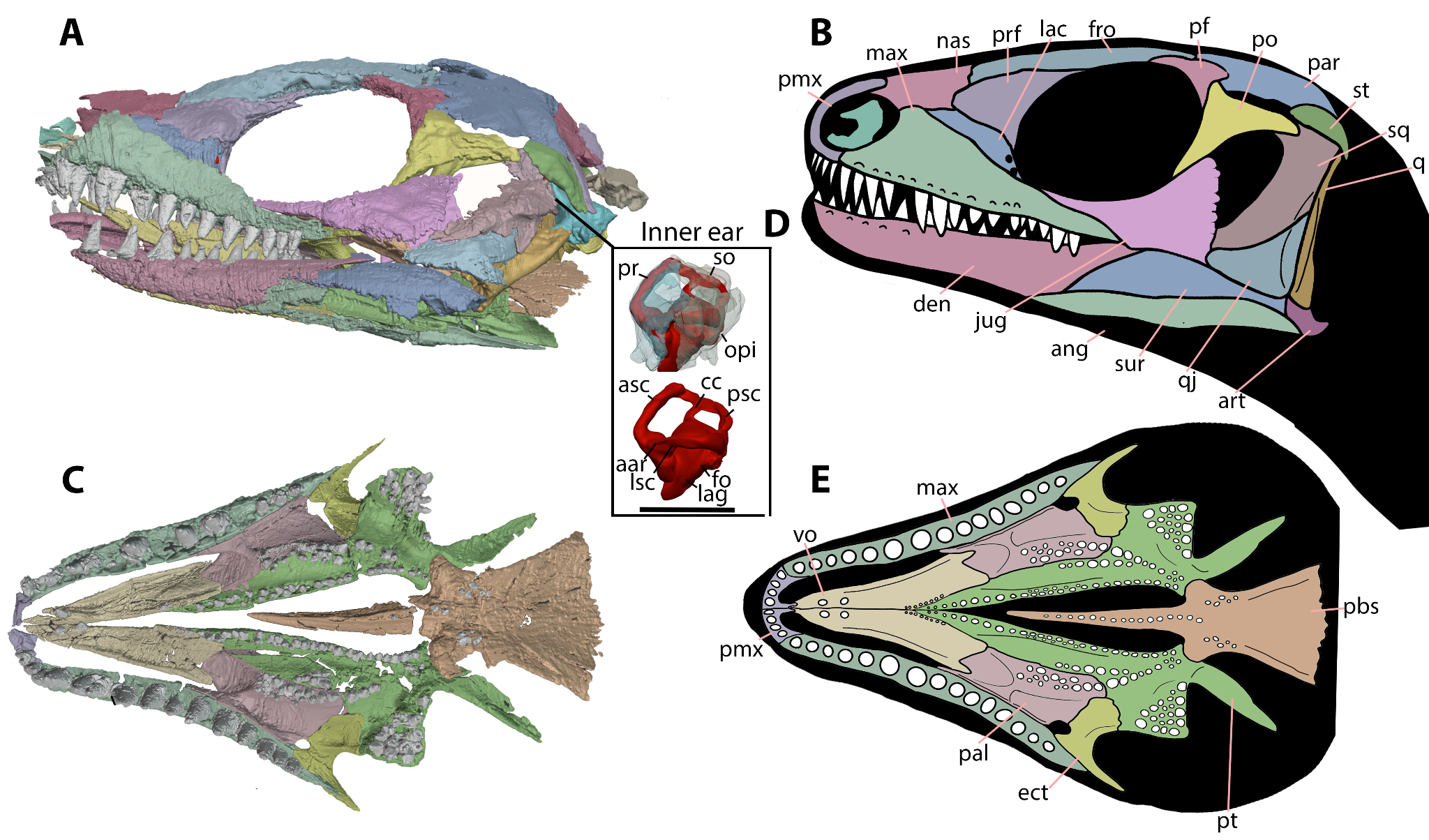
- Reconstructed skull of Milleretta
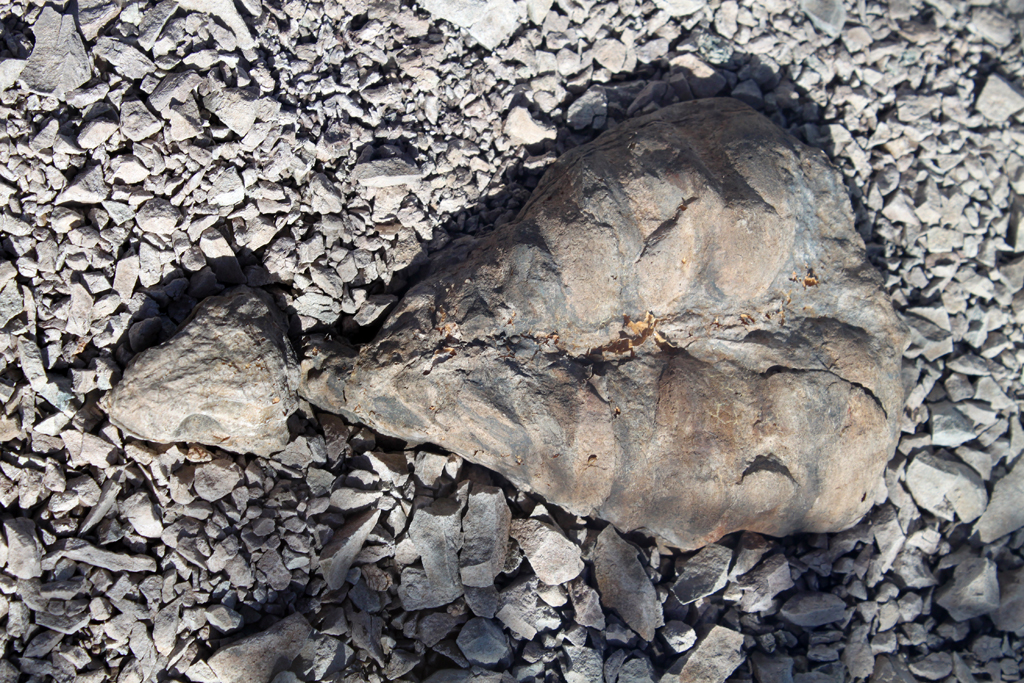
- Fossil of Eunotosaurus

Scientific classification
- Kingdom: Animalia
- Phylum: Chordata
- Class: Reptilia
- Subclass: †Parareptilia
- Order: †Millerosauria; Watson, 1957

Families
- †Millerettidae; †Eunotosauridae?

Synonyms
- Millerosauroidea Romer, 1966

= Millerosauria =

Millerosauria Temporal range: Middle to Late Permian, 265.8–251 Ma

Extinct order of reptiles

Millerosauria is a proposed extinct order of early reptiles that contains the families Millerettidae and Eunotosauridae. It was named in 1957 by Watson and represents a group of reptiles that were thought to be ancestral to Eosuchia (a now-defunct clade roughly corresponding to the non-saurian Neodiapsida) and modern reptiles. Many cladistic studies have interpreted members of the Millerosauria as an early-diverging group of 'parareptiles', but some phylogenetic analyses have demonstrated that 'Parareptilia' represents a group of unrelated early reptiles and is therefore polyphyletic. In 2025, Jenkins et al. recovered the subgroup Millerettidae close to Neodiapsida as the earliest-diverging group in the clade Parapleurota.

Eunotosaurus has been recovered as a stem-turtle in some cladistic studies.
