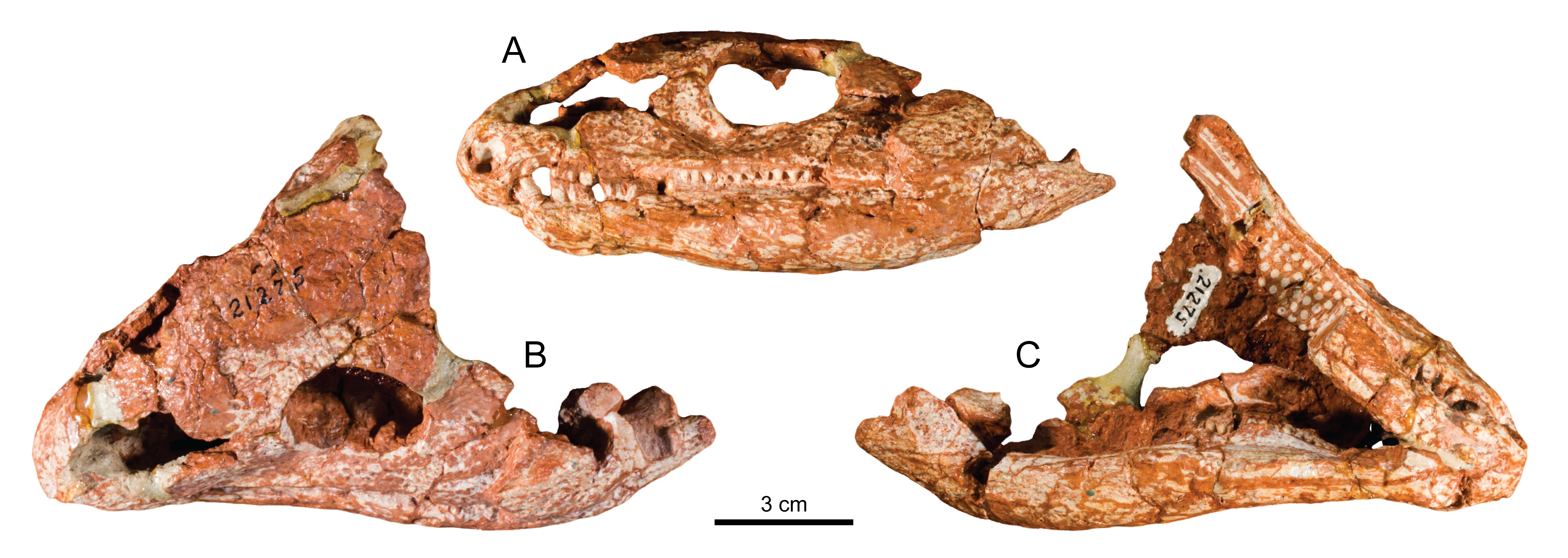
- Partial skull and mandible of USNM V 21275

Scientific classification
- Kingdom: Animalia
- Phylum: Chordata
- Clade: Tetrapoda
- Clade: Reptiliomorpha
- Family: †Captorhinidae
- Subfamily: †Moradisaurinae
- Genus: †Sumidadectes; Jung & Sues, 2024
- Species: †S. chozaensis

Binomial name
- †Sumidadectes chozaensis (Olson, 1954)

= Sumidadectes =

Sumidadectes Temporal range: Early Permian, Kungurian

Genus of captorhinid tetrapod

Sumidadectes is an extinct genus of captorhinid reptiliomorph in the subfamily Moradisaurinae, known from the Early Permian (Kungurian age) of Oklahoma and Texas, United States. The genus contains a single species, Sumidadectes chozaensis, which was originally placed in the genus Captorhinikos. It is known from several partial skulls and postcranial remains.

== History ==
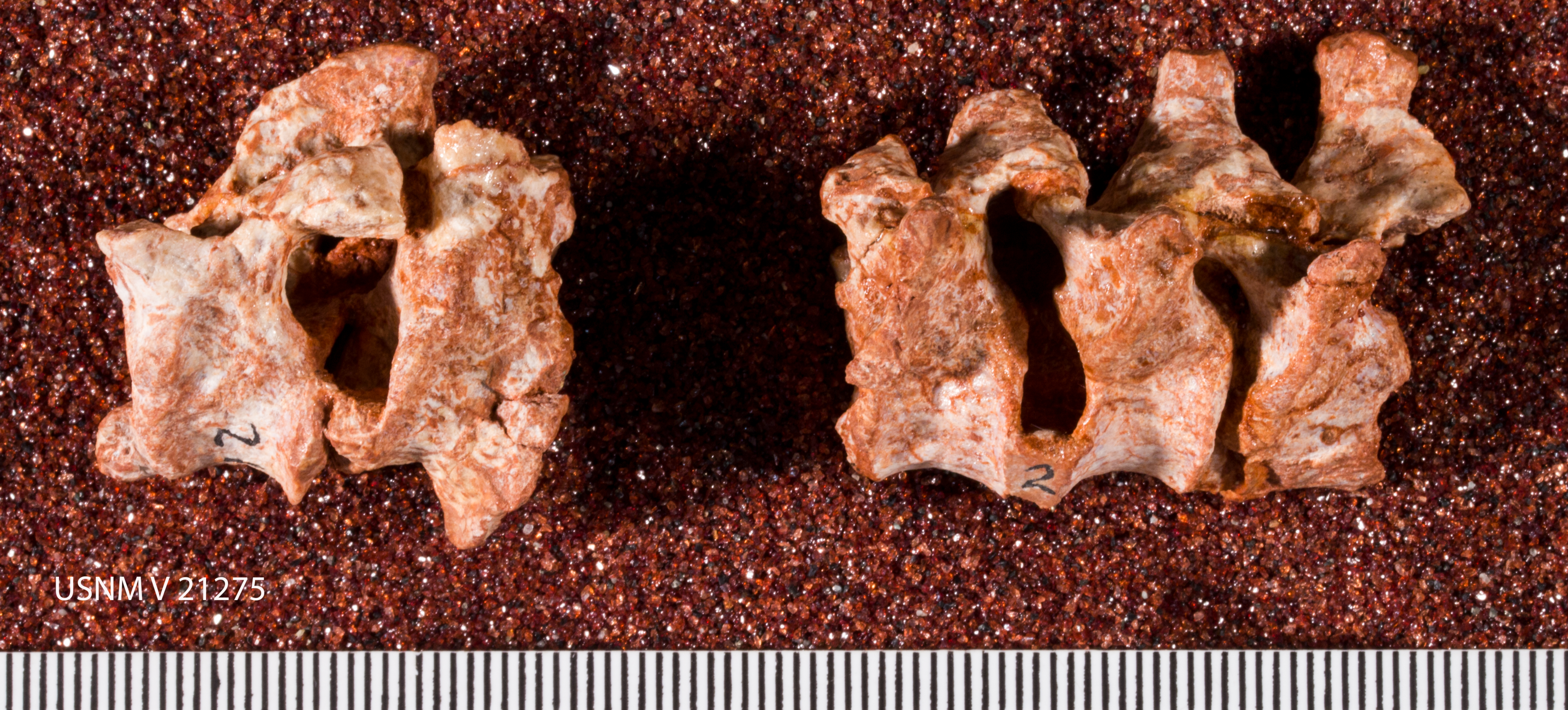
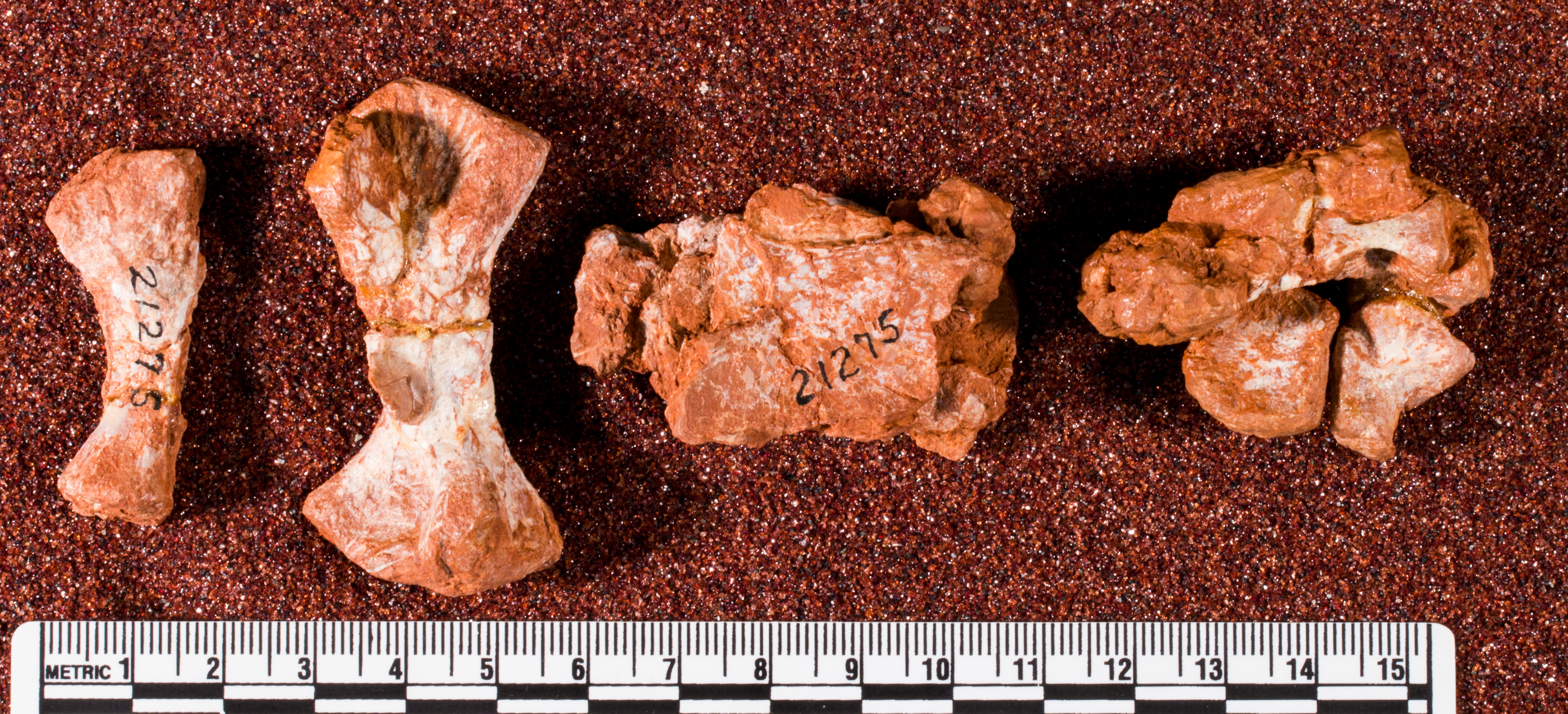
Dorsal vertebrae (top) and hindlimb bones (bottom) of USNM V 21275

In 1954, American paleontologist Everett C. Olson described Captorhinikos as a new genus of captorhinid based on fossils found in Permian-dated rock outcrops in Texas, US. He assigned these remains to two species: the type species, C. valensis, based on fossils from the upper Vale Formation in Knox County, and a second species, C. chozaensis, based on fossils (holotype FMNH UR 97) from the lower Choza Formation in Foard County. Shortly thereafter, Peter P. Vaughn (1958) briefly described USNM (National Museum of Natural History) V 21275, a skull and partial skeleton that had been collected in 1953 from the Hennessey Formation of Cleveland County, Oklahoma, as several bone fragments and later reassembled after preparation. Four years later, Olson reported three more specimens referable to C. chozaensis, including a skull and skeleton, and provided figures and a detailed description of the anatomy of this species. Olson named a third species of Captorhinikos, C. parvus, in 1970.

Beginning in 2014, phylogenetic analyses revealed that the three species traditionally placed within Captorhinikos are less closely related than initially realized; Modesto and colleagues (2014) recovered C. valensis as the basalmost member of the captorhinid subfamily Moradisaurinae, while recovering "C." chozaensis in an even earlier-diverging position. C. parvus was excluded from their work as it was under study by a different team of researchers, but was noted to not be a close relative of C. valensis. Modesto et al. (2018) instead recovered "C." chozaensis as the earliest-diverging moradisaurine, followed by C. valensis. In 2021, Albright and colleagues redescribed "C." parvus as belonging to the new genus Rhodotheratus.

=== Etymology ===
In 2024, Jason P. Jung and Hans-Dieter Sues named Sumidadectes as a new genus for "C." chozaensis. The generic name honors Stuart S. Sumida, in recognition of his research on tetrapods (such as captorhinids) from the Permo-Carboniferous. This is combined with the Greek word dektes, meaning 'biter'. The specific name chosen by Olson (1954), chozaensis, references the discovery of the holotype in the Choza Formation.

== Description ==
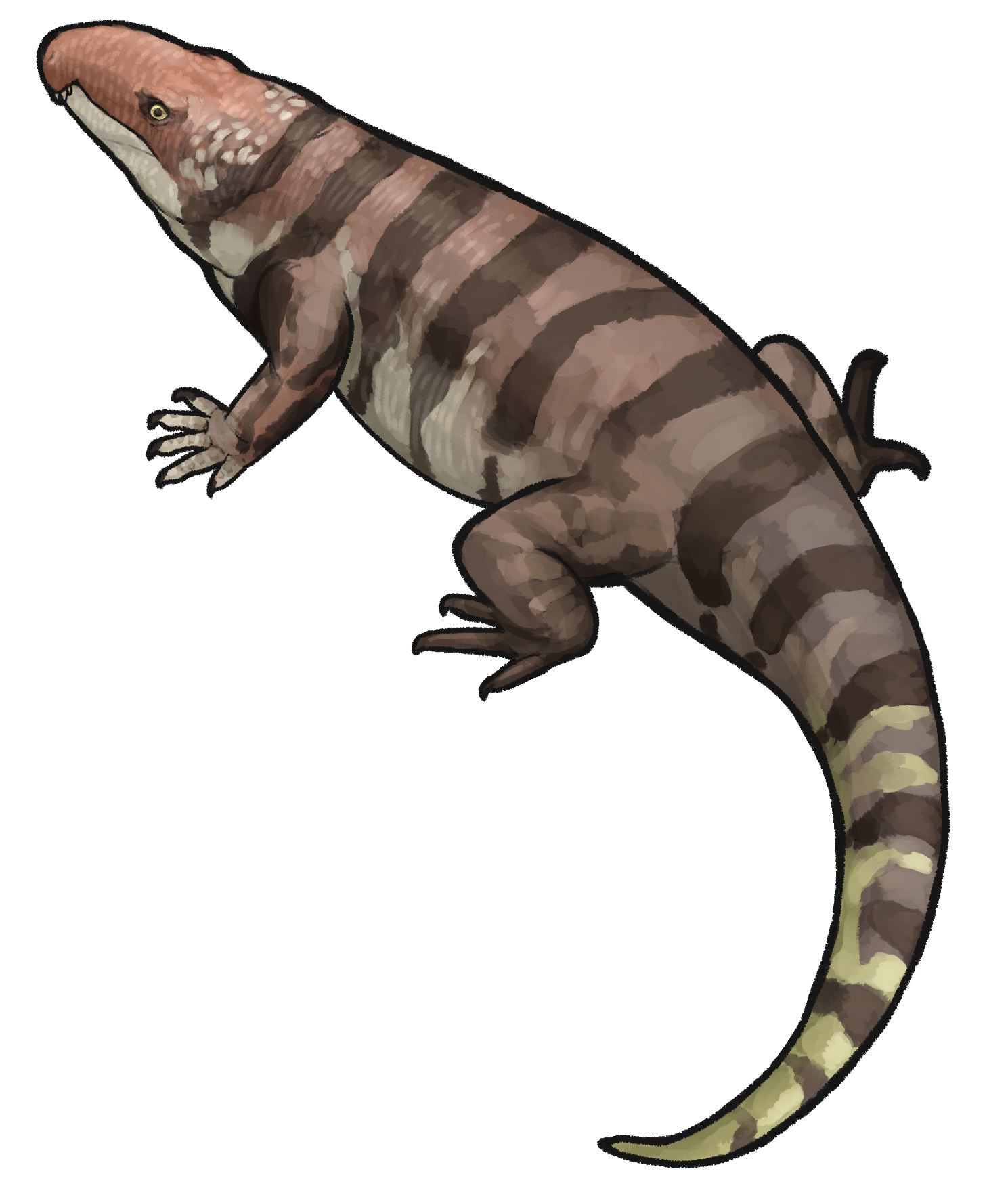
Life restoration

When seen from above, the outline of the skull is vaguely heart-shaped. All of the skulls referred to S. chozaensis are incomplete and crushed to some degree. The skull roof bones are ornamented with grooves and pits, as in other captorhinids. The premaxillae both bear three tall, conical teeth, the first two being notably larger. The maxillae (main upper tooth-bearing bone) have five rows of teeth, the outermost row bearing at least nine tooth positions, with at least 11 in the third through fourth rows, and six in the innermost row. The dentaries (lower tooth-bearing bones) have four rows of teeth. Toward the front, there is a single row of teeth, with the third tooth having an enlarged caniniform morphology. The outermost tooth row has at least nine teeth, followed by at least 12, 11, and six in the following rows, respectively. Palatal teeth are observed on the pterygoids.

Like other captorhinids, Sumidadectes likely had 25 presacral vertebrae, followed by two sacral vertebrae (a number typical of early amniotes). 15 caudal (tail) vertebrae are preserved in one specimen, but more would have been present in life.

== Classification ==
To test the affinities and relationships of Sumidadectes, Jung & Sues (2024) included it in an updated version of the phylogenetic matrix of Cisneros et al. (2020). As recovered by Modesto et al. (2018), Sumidadectes was placed as the earliest-diverging member of the Moradisaurinae, a clade generally recognized by the large body size and multiple tooth rows of its members. Later in 2024, Reisz and colleagues described Indosauriscus, a new moradisaurine from India. Using an updated version of the matrix of Sidor et al. (2022), they recovered Sumidadectes in a more derived position, consistently as the sister taxon to Captorhinikos valensis.

In their 2025 description of the Zambian moradisaurine Amenoyengi, Jenkins et al. combined three previously published phylogenetic datasets to create a more comprehensive analysis. As generally recovered by most previous researchers, Sumidadectes was again recognized as the basalmost moradisaurine, followed by Captorhinikos valensis. These results are displayed in the cladogram below:

- †Captorhinidae
  - Euconcordia cunninghami
  - - Opisthodontosaurus carrolli
    - - - Rhiodenticulatus heatoni
        - Rhodotheratus parvus
      - - Saurorictus australis
        - - Protocaptorhinus pricei
          - - Romeria prima
            - Romeria texana
        - - - Captorhinus laticeps
            - - Labidosauriscus richardi
              - - Captorhinus aguti
                - - Captorhinus kierani
                  - Captorhinus magnus
          - - Reiszorhinus olsoni
            - - Labidosaurus hamatus
              - Moradisaurinae
                - Sumidadectes chozaensis
                - - Captorhinikos valensis
                  - - - Labidosaurikos meachami
                      - Rothianiscus sp.
                    - - - Kahneria seltina
                        - Tramuntanasaurus tiai
                      - - Moradisaurus grandis
                        - - Amenoyengi mpunduensis
                          - - Gansurhinus naobaogouensis
                            - Gansurhinus qingtoushanensis
