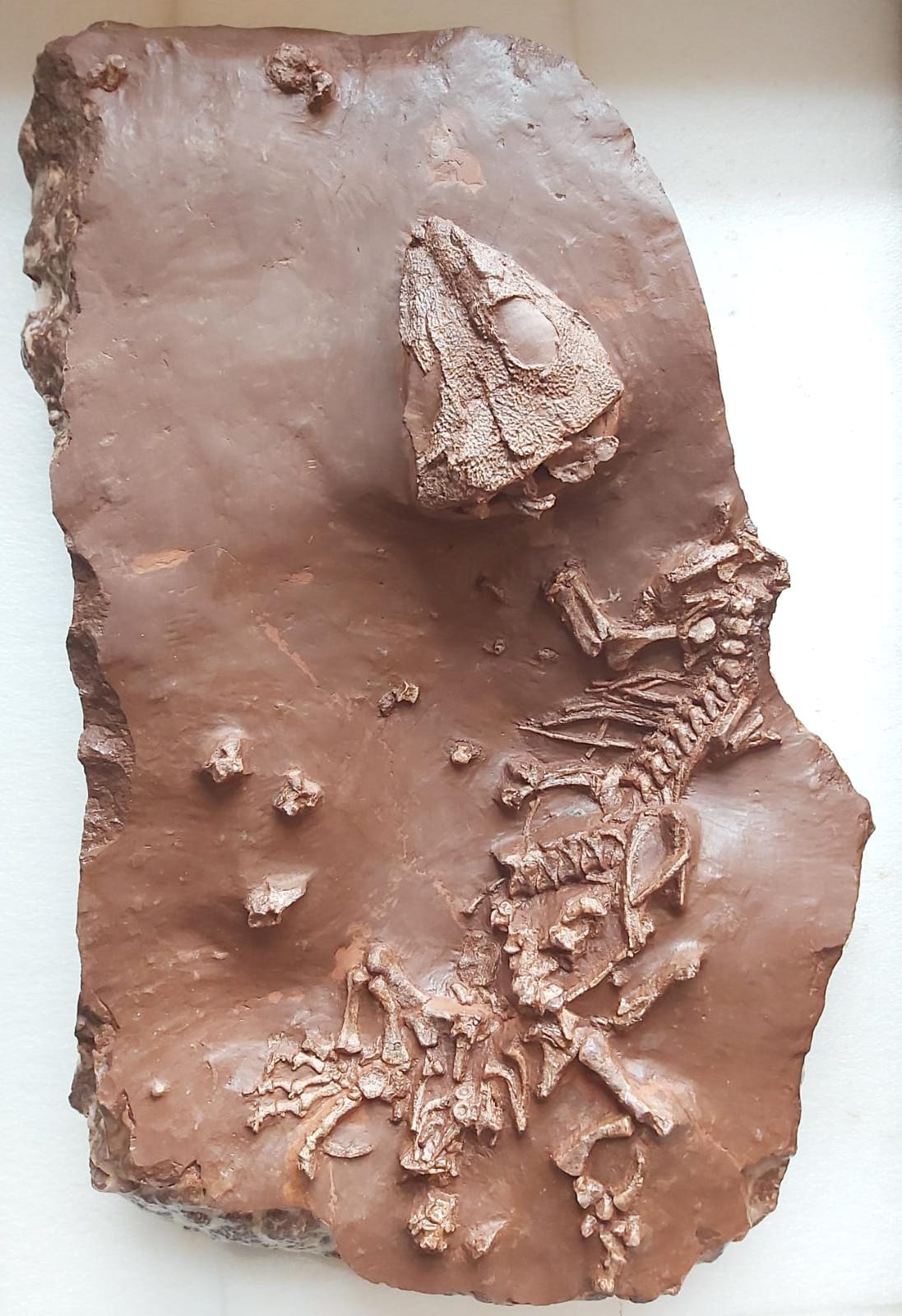
- Holotype skeleton of Tramuntanasaurus tiai

Scientific classification
- Kingdom: Animalia
- Phylum: Chordata
- Family: †Captorhinidae
- Subfamily: †Moradisaurinae
- Genus: †Tramuntanasaurus; Matamales-Andreu et al., 2023

Type species
- †Tramuntanasaurus tiai Matamales-Andreu et al., 2023

= Tramuntanasaurus =

Tramuntanasaurus Temporal range: 284–272 Ma

Extinct genus of large captorhinid tetrapods

Tramuntanasaurus is an extinct genus of moradisaurine captorhinid that lived during the late Early Permian (Artinskian–Kungurian) or early Middle Permian (early Roadian) in what is now the island of Mallorca of the Balearic Islands. The genus is only known by its type species, Tramuntanasaurus tiai, which was named in 2023 by Rafel Matamales-Andreu, Eudald Mujal, Àngel Galobart and Josep Fortuny, from an almost complete skeleton discovered in 2019.

== Etymology ==
The genus is named after the Serra de Tramuntana, the main mountain range of Mallorca, where the holotype was found, and from saurus, which means "lizard" in Latin. The specific epithet honors the discoverer of the specimen, Sebastià (Tià) Matamalas Riera, who is also the father of Rafel Matamales-Andreu.

== Description ==
Tramuntanasaurus was a medium-sized captorhinid, measuring about 50 cm (20 in) long from head to tail. The skull is 8.3 cm (3.3 in) long and 7 cm (2.8 in) wide. It is distinctly triangular in dorsal view, where it shows a gradual narrowing towards its anterior end but without a sharp decrease in width in the snout area (unlike most moradisaurines).

In the upper jaw, the maxillae form medially extending plates, each bearing up to five rows of teeth. After an anterior area with a single row of four teeth, further rows of teeth begin to appear, up to five, arranged diagonally to each other. These teeth are bulbous, with narrowed bases and subquadrate/subtrapezoidal section. They clearly show wear facets on their distal side, producing a lateral "heel" outline.

In the mandible, the two most anterior teeth are conical, widened and directed forwards. They are followed by a single row of three smaller teeth directed upwards. Immediately afterwards, on an enlarged area of the dentary bone, several rows of teeth arranged diagonally begin to appear. In the widest area of the dentary plates, five rows of teeth can be distinguished. Like the maxillary teeth, the dentary teeth have a subquadratic-subtrapezoidal section and are bulbous, with a narrowed base. Tooth wear is visible, developing a "heel" on the mesial side of the teeth.

Tramuntanasaurus differs from all other moradisaurines by a combination of characters such as the presence of a double row of teeth anterior to the tooth plate (unlike Captorhinikos and Moradisaurus), the absence of a diastema (unlike Gansurhinus and Kahneria), the anteriormost dentary teeth oriented forward (unlike Captorhinikos and Gecatogomphius), the presence of five tooth rows on the maxillae and dentaries, a broad snout relative to the length of the skull (unlike Labidosaurikos, Moradisaurus, and Rothianiscus), a postorbital cheek with little lateral convexity, a long anterior process of the frontal, an anterior process of the jugal reaching the anterior margin of the orbit, and pterygoids without teeth.

== Paleobiology ==
=== Diet ===
Like other moradisaurines, Tramuntanasaurus was specialized for the herbivory of high-fiber plants. The upper and lower jaws have up to five rows of teeth with which the animal could chew and grind plant material thanks to a mandibular articulation allowing a forward and backward movement of the lower jaw (called propalinal movement).

=== Locomotion ===
Comparison of the autopodia of the holotype of Tramuntanasaurus tiai with the different footprint morphotypes occurring in stratigraphically close strata allowed to assign it a specific ichnospecies. Hyloidichnus bifurcatus is an ichnospecies assigned to the Captorhinidae. Two forms of H. bifurcatus have been documented in the Permian of Mallorca, one large and one smaller, both also distinguished by slightly different relative depth patterns (related to the functional prevalence of autopodia), showing that weight distribution was different between small and large moradisaurines. These differences are probably related to different head-to-body size proportions, and/or to notably different morphologies of the postcranial skeleton. H. bifurcatus is characterized by semi-plantigrade and pentadactyl footprints, with digits ending in a characteristic "T" shape. The length of the digits increases from digit I (the innermost) to digit V (the outermost). The track is arranged alternately, the manus imprint facing the midline and the pes imprint approximately parallel to it. The small H. bifurcatus from Mallorca corresponds in size, proportions and foot shape to the holotype foot of Tramuntanasaurus tiai. Some of the tracks were left by walking animals while others were produced by running animals. When the animal moved faster, it assumed a more erect position with its legs less spread and closer to the trunk, decreasing the lateral undulating movement of the vertebral column as also indicated by the tail drag marks which are much less sinuous than those of walking animals.

== Paleoecology and age ==
The holotype of Tramuntanasaurus was discovered at the Torrent de na Nadala 3 site located on the northwest coast of Mallorca near Banyalbufar. It comes from the Port des Canonge Formation, which is thought to be between the Artinskian and the Kungurian of the Lower Permian. However, an early Roadian age (basalmost Middle Permian) for the top of the formation cannot be ruled out. At that time, Mallorca was not yet an island and was part of Pangea, a supercontinent that had the shape of a "C". More precisely, Mallorca was located on the eastern edge of this continent, at an equatorial latitude where, however, a tropical climate with two seasons (dry and wet) reigned. Tramuntanasaurus was found in rocks interpreted as deposits from a temporary waterhole located in the floodplain of a meandering river.

The Torren de na Nadala site also yielded the partial skeleton of an indeterminate gorgonopsian therapsid as well as vertebrate tracks indicating the presence of non-therapsid synapsids (Caseidae, Sphenacodontidae, Edaphosauridae, Ophiacodontidae), araeoscelidian diapsids or non-varanodontine Varanopidae, a non-pareiasaur pareiasauromorpha (Nycteroleteridae), and two distinct Moradisaurinae, one of which probably corresponds to Tramuntanasaurus. A maxilla fragment of a much larger moradisaurine (estimated skull length between 17.7 and 26.4 cm (7.0 and 10.4 in)) is known from the site of Platja de son Bunyola. This form has only three rows of teeth, whereas Tramuntanasaurus has five. Since in moradisaurines the number of tooth rows increases with age, this large moradisaurine certainly represents a different taxon from Tramuntanasaurus.

== Phylogeny ==
The phylogenetic analysis performed by Matamales-Andreu et al. (2023) placed Tramuntanasaurus tiai in the monophyletic clade Moradisaurinae. Within the latter, Tramuntanasaurus formed a polytomy with Kahneria, Labidosaurikos and the most derived group of moradisaurines (Gansurhinus, Moradisaurus and Rothianiscus).

In 2025, Jenkins et al. used an updated phylogenetic matrix incorporating data from three previous analyses (including that by Matamales-Andreu et al.) to test the relationships of Amenoyengi, a moradosaurine from Zambia. Their results recovered Tramuntanasaurus in a more resolved position, as the sister taxon to Kahneria. These results are displayed in the cladogram below:

- Moradisaurinae
  - - Rothianiscus spp.
    - Labidosaurikos
  - - - Kahneria
      - Tramuntanasaurus
    - - Moradisaurus
      - - Amenoyengi
        - - Gansurhinus qingtoushanensis
          - Gansurhinus naobaogouensis
