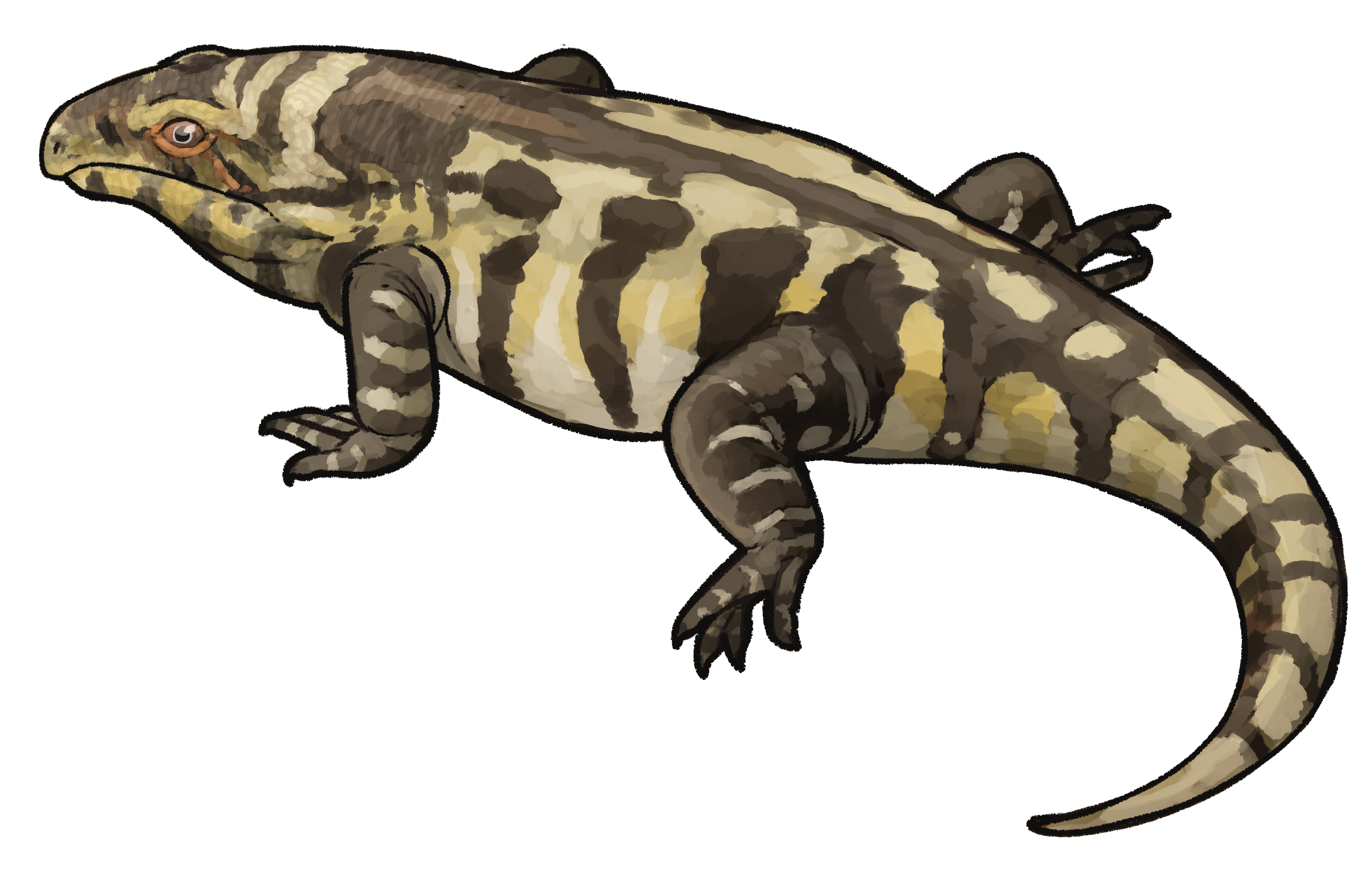
- Life Restoration

Scientific classification
- Domain: Eukaryota
- Kingdom: Animalia
- Phylum: Chordata
- Class: Reptilia
- Family: †Captorhinidae
- Genus: †Reiszorhinus; Sumida et al., 2010
- Species: †R. olsoni

Binomial name
- †Reiszorhinus olsoni Sumida et al., 2010

= Reiszorhinus =

Reiszorhinus Temporal range: Early Permian

Extinct genus of tetrapods

Reiszorhinus is an extinct genus of captorhinid tetrapods known from the Early Permian of the United States. The type species is Reiszorhinus olsoni. Fossils have been found from the Waggoner Ranch Formation in north-central Texas. It is distinguishable by its recurved teeth and extremely large Meckelian foramen on the inner surface of the lower jaw. It has been considered a primitive member of its family because it has a single tooth along the margins of the jaws. While most single-tooth-rowed captorhinids are small, Reiszorhinus is relatively large. However, Reiszorhinus differs from other large captorhinids in that the cheek region is not wide and expanded.

Reiszorhinus olsoni was first named in 2010. Specimens belonging to the species were previously misidentified as those of the similar captorhinid Labidosaurus hamatus. Reiszorhinus is one of the most basal captorhinids, along with the genera Romeria, Concordia, and Protocaptorhinus.
