= Port des Canonge Formation =

Geologic formation in Mallorca, Spain

- Stratigraphic range: Lower–middle? Permian, Cisuralian–Guadalupian
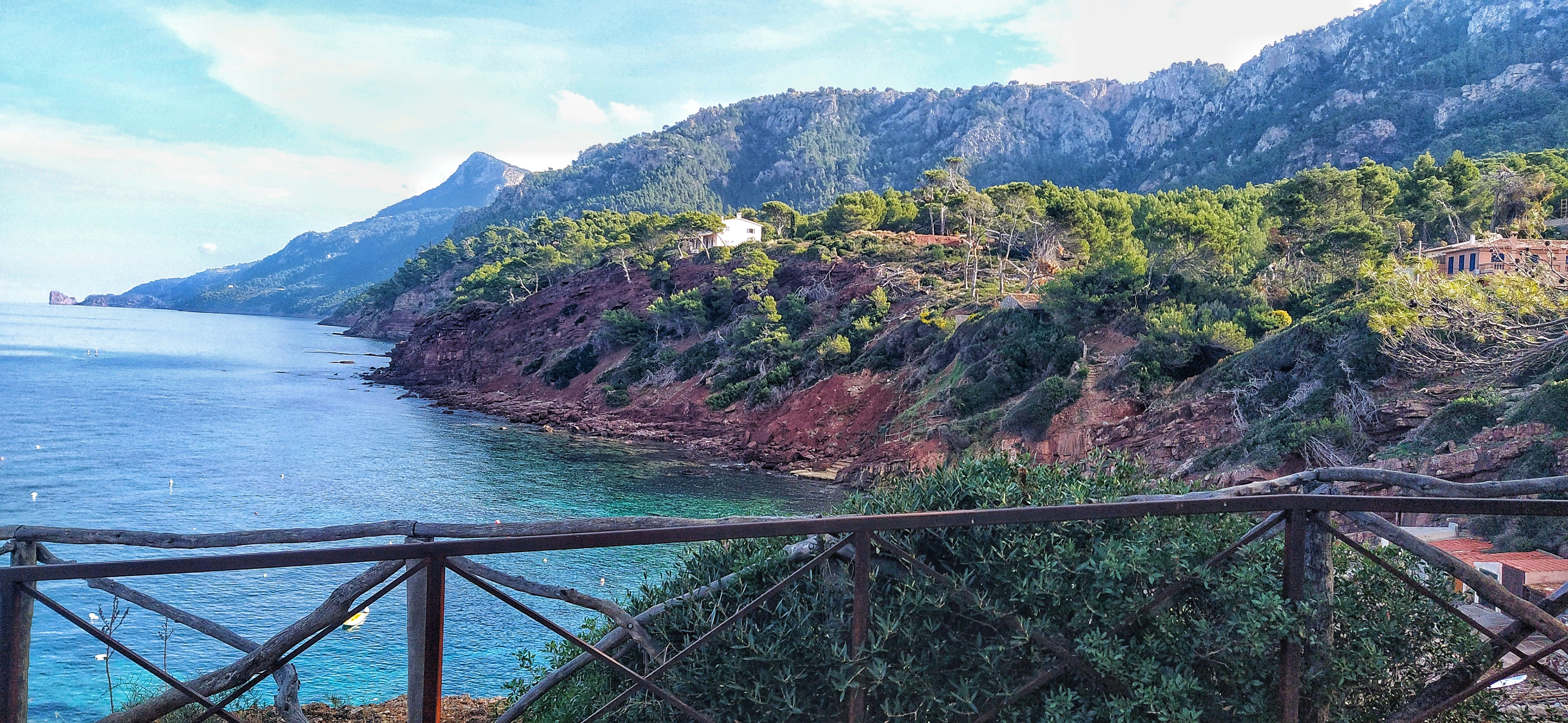
- Exposed redbeds
- Type: Geological formation
- Underlies: Pedra de s'Ase Formation
- Overlies: Bec de s'Àguila Formation
- Thickness: At least up 370 m (1,210 ft) in the Port des Canonge-Hort de sa Cova section

Lithology
- Primary: sandstone, lutite (mudstone)

Location
- Coordinates: 39°41′14″N 02°30′48″E
- Region: Mallorca
- Country: Spain

Type section
- Named for: Port d'es Canonge village
- Port des Canonge Formation (Spain) Port des Canonge Formation (Balearic Islands) Port des Canonge Formation (Mallorca)

The Port des Canonge Formation is a lower–middle Permian-age geologic formation in the Mediterranean island of Mallorca. It consists of red to brown-colored sedimentary rocks (red beds) such as sandstone and mudstone, and is located in what back then was the western peri-Tethys Ocean.

== Geological Context ==
The Permian geological context of Mallorca is part of the larger framework of the Balearic Islands, an extension of the Betic fold and thrust belt formed during the Alpine orogeny. On the islands, only Mallorca and Menorca have exposed Permian beds, likely derived from sedimentary successions deposited in isolated basins along the eastern edge of the Iberian plate, sharing a structural connection with the Iberian Peninsula, emerged during the collapse of the Variscan orogeny in the late Carboniferous to early Permian. This collapse led to a transtensional and extensional tectonic regime, creating semi-graben structures that facilitated sediment accumulation.

Palaeogeographically, these basins were located in the western peri-Tethys and shifted from approximately 7°S to 4°N latitude throughout the Permian, experiencing a tropical, semi-arid, and seasonal climate.

On Mallorca, Permian rocks are primarily found along the coastal cliffs of the Serra de Tramuntana and partially inland, though often obscured by forest cover. The base of the Permian succession is faulted against underlying Carboniferous rocks, and the transition to the overlying Lower Triassic Punta Roja Formation is marked by an unconformity.

== Paleoenvironment ==
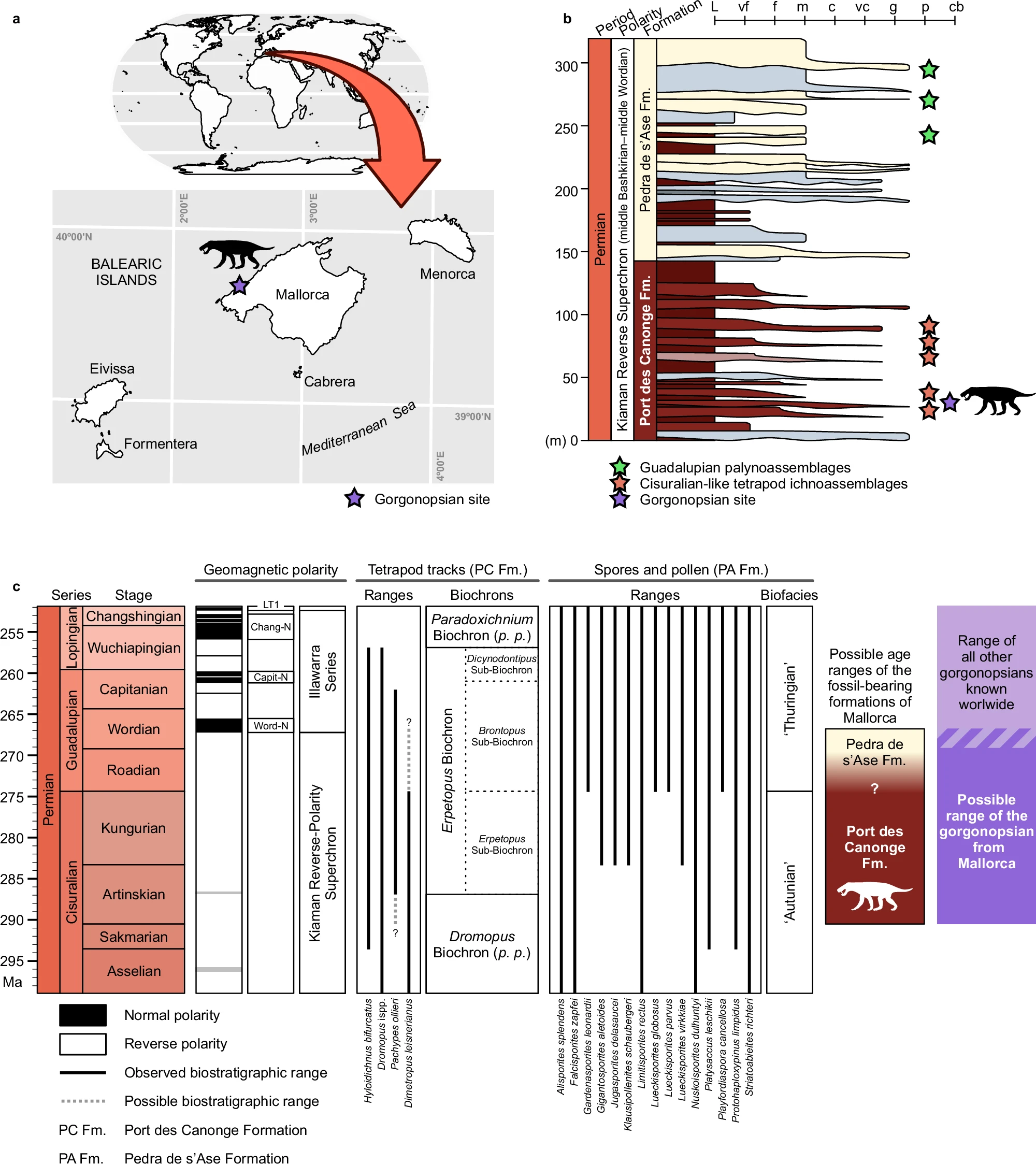
Geological and stratigraphical context of the formation

The Port des Canonge Formation overlies the coarse deposits of the Bec de s'Àguila Formation (colluvium and alluvial fan deposits) and is overlain by the Pedra de s'Ase Formation (fluvial environment with rare floodplain deposits). The two main outcrop areas of the Port des Canonge Formation, the Racó de s'Algar-Pedra de s'Ase section and the Port des Canonge-Hort de sa Cova section, show a thickness of approximately 222.5 m (730 ft) and 370 m (1,210 ft), respectively.

The Port des Canonge Formation represents an intra-continental fine-grained meandering river system with extensive floodplain deposits, flowing southeast along the basin's main axis. It is composed of red sandstones and red lutites (Note: In describing the Permian formations of Mallorca in 2022, Rafel Matamales Andreu et al. use the rarely used term lutite to designate these rocks alternating with sandstone beds (Matamales-Andreu et al., 2022, pp.11-12). Lutite is a general term that groups together different types of very fine-grained rocks whose elements have a diameter of less than 1/16 of a millimeter. In later publications these authors use the more precise term mudstones for the same rocks (Matamales-Andreu et al., 2023, pp.2 ; 3 (fig.1), Matamales-Andreu et al., 2024, p.3 (fig.2)).) organized in fining-upward sequences, dominated by lateral accretion surfaces from channel bars and overbank deposits. Breccia lithofacies occur as basal lags or isolated beds, reflecting reworked floodplain sediments. Sandstone lithofacies include ripple-marked, laminated, and massive sands, indicating waning flows and overbank deposits. Lutites are characterized by massive and laminated facies, disrupted by plant roots and invertebrate burrows, recording periods of low sedimentation or subaerial exposure. Decreased subsidence rates favored a longitudinal fluvial system, while significant accommodation space allowed for the deposition of mudstones and fine sandstones.

The system is marked by lateral accretion surfaces and stabilized riverbanks, likely due to abundant floodplain vegetation, which prevented channel widening. Evidence of this vegetation includes developed soils, occasional plant remains, and logs despite the oxidized conditions.

Palaeosols with carbonate nodules, calcrete hardpans, and gleyed patches developed under dry conditions, pointing to seasonal desiccation of ponds, which likely functioned as waterholes. Fossils, including tetrapod tracks and skeletons, rhizocretions, and plant remains, emphasize the ecological importance of these floodplain environments.

The formation's palaeocurrents suggest a southeast-directed flow, consistent with the meandering river interpretation. Overall, the facies suggest a semi-arid, dynamic fluvial system shaped by meandering rivers and seasonal dry periods.

== Dating ==
No radiometric dating is available for the Port des Canonge formation due to the absence of volcanic layers in it. In 2022, based on tetrapod footprint associations, Matamales-Andreu et al. assigned it an Artinskian–Kungurian (upper lower Permian) age. In addition, the overlying Pedra de s'Ase Formation was dated to the middle Permian (Roadian–Wordian) by a particular palynological association and paleomagnetic data. A year later, however, Matamales-Andreu et al. proposed (with some doubts) that the age of the upper part of the Port des Canonge Formation could also reach the base of the middle Permian (lower Roadian).

== Paleobiota ==
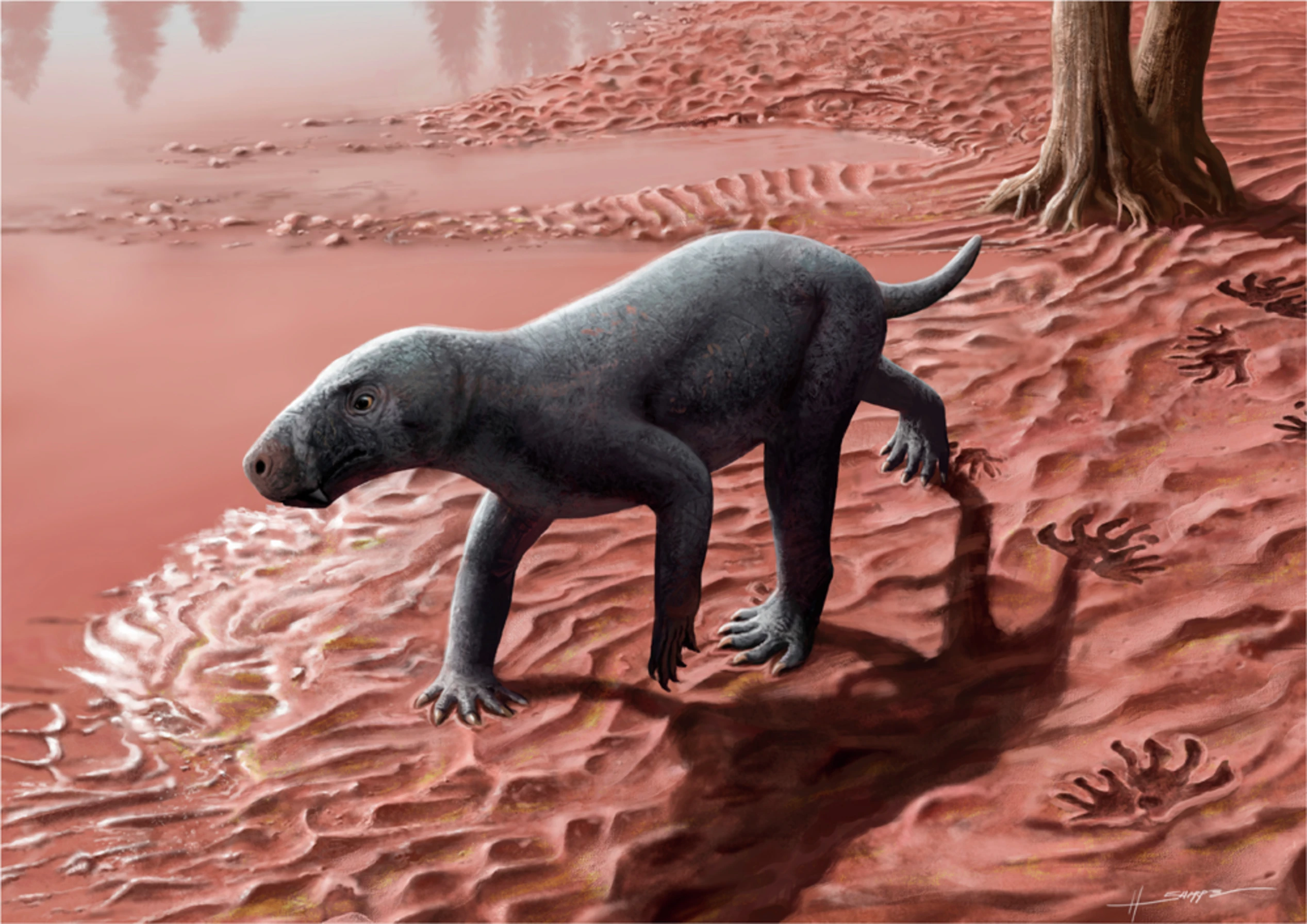
Life reconstruction of the local gorgonopsian in a floodplain setting

The Port des Canonge Formation contains numerous fossils. The terrestrial vertebrate fauna, represented by both footprints and skeletal remains, is remarkable in showing a mixture of tetrapods typical of the early Permian (pelycosaurs and moradisaurines) with others rather characteristic of middle and late Permian assemblages (non-mammalian therapsids).

Color key: Taxon / Reclassified taxon / Taxon falsely reported as present / Dubious taxon or junior synonym / Ichnotaxon / Ootaxon / Morphotaxon	Notes; Uncertain or tentative taxa are in small text; ~~crossed out~~ taxa are discredited.

=== Invertebrates ===
Genus	Species	Location	Material	Made by	Images
Cochlichnus	C. anguineus	Racó de s'Algar	Burrows	Nematodes; Insect larva	
Cruziana	C. isp.	Alcova de son Bunyola	Feeding trace	Represented by a single specimen not identified at the ichnospecific level due to its poor preservation. Given its size, this trace could have been produced by notostracan crustaceans, similar to those described in the south of France.	

=== Tetrapods ===
Genus	Species	Location	Material	Notes	Images
Algarpes	A. ferus	Platjola des munt de Pedres	Footprints	Tetrapod tracks, referred to gorgonopsians.	
Characichnos	C. isp.	Punta d'en Pere Mir Platjola des munt de Pedres Racó de s'Algar	Footprints	Swimming tetrapod tracks.	
Dimetropus	D. leisnerianus; cf. D. isp.	Platjola des munt de Pedres Racó de s'Algar	Footprints	Tetrapod tracks, referred to multiple early synapsids: caseids, ophiacodontids, edaphosaurids, and sphenacodontids. Tracks of cf. Dimetropus sp. are considered to belong to a medium-sized caseid synapsid similar to Ennatosaurus.	Example of Dimetropus
Dromopus	D. isp.	Platjola des munt de Pedres Racó de s'Algar	Footprints	Tetrapod tracks, referred to araeoscelidians or varanopids.	
Gorgonopsia indet.	Indeterminate	Torrent de na Nadala	DA21/17-01-01, disarticulated partial skeleton consisting of a mandible, skull fragments, a saber-toothed canine, four incisors, neck and tail vertebrae, two ribs, a nearly complete left hind limb, and bones of the right foot.	A relatively small gorgonopsian therapsid, representing the oldest record of the group worldwide.	DA21/17-01-01 material
Hyloidichnus	H. bifurcatus	Punta d'en Pere Mir Platjola des munt de Pedres Torrent de na Nadala Racó de s'Algar	Footprints	Tetrapod tracks, referred to captorhinid eureptiles. Two forms are known, one large and one smaller, both also distinguished by slightly different relative depth patterns (related to the functional prevalence of autopodia), showing that weight distribution was different between small and large moradisaurines. The small morphotype of H. bifurcatus from Mallorca match with the size, proportions and shape of the foot of the small moradisaurine Tramuntanasaurus tiai present in strata close to those of the footprints.	Example of Hyloidichnus
Moradisaurinae indet.	Indeterminate	Platja de son Bunyola	MBCN 15730, a partial right maxilla and parts of the palate	A large moradisaurine captorhinid. Skull length is estimated to be between 17.7 cm (7.0 in) and 26.4 cm (10.4 in). This form has only three rows of teeth on the mid-posterior part of the maxilla, whereas Tramuntanasaurus, a much smaller sympatric taxon, has five. Since in moradisaurines the number of tooth rows increases with age, MBCN 15730 certainly belongs to a different taxon than Tramuntanasaurus.	
Pachypes	cf. P. ollieri	Platjola des munt de Pedres	Footprints	Tetrapod tracks, referred to non-pareiasaur pareiasauromorph parareptiles, more specifically to a nycteroleterid.	
Tramuntanasaurus	T. tiai	Torrent de na Nadala	The holotype is a nearly complete semi articulated skeleton. Several other skeletons are known but have not yet been described.	A medium-sized (skull length: 8.3 cm (3.3 in)) moradisaurine captorhinid.	Holotype skeleton of Tramuntanasaurus tiai.

=== Plants ===
Multiple large logs along carbonaceous debris have been found in Cova des Carbó.

Genus	Species	Stratigraphic position	Material	Notes	Images
Hermitia	H. sp.	Racó de s'Algar	Three foliated penultimate shoot fragments.	Branched shoots referred to conifers, probably Voltziales.	
Feysia	?F. sp.	Es Tamarell Platjola des munt de Pedres Torrent de na Nadala Racó de s'Algar	Branched shoots.	Branched shoots referred to conifers, probably Voltziales.	
