= Amenoyengi =

Amenoyengi Temporal range: Late Permian, early-mid Wuchiapingian

Scientific classification
- Kingdom: Animalia
- Phylum: Chordata
- Clade: Tetrapoda
- Clade: Reptiliomorpha
- Family: †Captorhinidae
- Subfamily: †Moradisaurinae
- Genus: †Amenoyengi; Jenkins et al., 2025
- Species: †A. mpunduensis

Binomial name
- †Amenoyengi mpunduensis Jenkins et al., 2025

Genus of captorhinid tetrapods

Amenoyengi (meaning "many-tooth") is an extinct genus of captorhinids known from the Late Permian Madumabisa Mudstone Formation of Zambia. The genus contains a single species, Amenoyengi mpunduensis, known from a single crushed skull. It is one of the youngest known captorhinids.

== Discovery and naming ==
The Amenoyengi holotype specimen, BP/1/3899, was discovered in during fieldwork between 1960 and 1961 by J. W. Kitching in outcrops of the upper Madumabisa Mudstone Formation ('Locality 4'), part of the Luangwa Basin, in northern Zambia. The specimen consists of an isolated skull. It is dorsoventrally crushed and eroded, with much of the cranium's exterior missing due to weathering. The braincase and palate are well-preserved. The skull belongs to a subadult individual.

In 2000, C. E. Gow published a brief description of BP/1/3899, noting the discovery of a single articulated digit found alongside the skull that was now stored separately. Gow identified the skull as an indeterminate species of the older and more well-known genus Captorhinus, observing that the skull demonstrated almost all of the anatomy typical of this genus aside from the morphology of the teeth.

In 2025, Jenkins and colleagues described Amenoyengi mpunduensis as a new genus and species of captorhinids based on these fossil remains. The generic name, Amenoyengi, combines the Bemba words ameno, meaning "teeth" and yengi, meaning "many", referencing the heavily denticulate nature of the taxon, with multiple rows of teeth on the maxilla and dentary. The specific name, mpunduensis, references Old Mpundu, a village near the type locality.

Dating to the early-mid Wuchiapingian age of the late Permian period, Amenoyengi is one of the youngest (most recent) known members of the Captorhinidae.

== Description ==
The holotype skull of Amenoyengi is notably small, at around 65 millimetres (2.6 in) long. The fusion between braincase bones and the interdigitating morphology of the sutures between bones implies that, despite its small size, the holotype individual may have reached somatic maturity. The few dermatocranium bones of the holotype with preserved external surfaces show dermal sculpting in a honeycomb-like pattern, typical of captorhinids. The maxilla bears an enlarged caniniform tooth and at least four rows of teeth with a maximum of 11 tooth positions. The dentary bears two caniniform teeth and four rows of teeth with a maximum of 13 tooth positions.

== Classification ==
To test the relationships of Amenoyengi with other captorhinids, Jenkins and colleagues (2025) combined the phylogenetic datasets of three previous analyses—those of Liu (2022), Matamales-Andreu et al. (2023), and Jung and Sues (2024)—to create a more comprehensive phylogeny. This phylogenetic analysis recovered Amenoyengi as a member of the captorhinid clade Moradisaurinae, as the sister taxon to Gansurhinus spp. These results are displayed in the cladogram below:

- Moradisaurinae
  - - Rothianiscus sp.
    - Labidosaurikos
  - - - Kahneria
      - Tramuntanasaurus
    - - Moradisaurus
      - - Amenoyengi
        - - Gansurhinus qingtoushanensis
          - Gansurhinus naobaogouensis
