= Hamilton Quarry =

- Stratigraphic range: ~300–298 Ma
- Type: Lagerstätte

Location
- Location: near Hamilton, Kansas
- Coordinates: 37°58′49″N 96°6′50″W
- Country: United States

Hamilton Quarry is a Late Carboniferous lagerstätte near Hamilton, Kansas, United States. It has a diverse assemblage of unusually well-preserved marine, euryhaline, freshwater, flying, and terrestrial fossils (invertebrates, vertebrates, and plants). The habitat of some of these faunal elements, as for anamniotic stegocephalians, is debated; although some of these have traditionally been interpreted as freshwater inhabitants, some may have been euryhaline. This extraordinary mix of fossils suggests it was once an estuary. This type of Lagerstätte is considered a Konservat-Lagerstätte (or conservation lagerstätte), due to the quality the preservation of soft tissue (skin preservation).

The lagerstätte occurs within a paleovalley that was incised into the surrounding Carboniferous cyclothemic sequence during a time of low sea level and was then filled in during a subsequent transgression. The channel has a capping series of interbedded laminated limestones and mudstones for which are designated the Lagerstätte beds or ‘vertebrate horizon’. This facies contains a well-preserved mixed assemblage of terrestrial (conifers, insects, myriapods, reptiles), freshwater (ostracods), aquatic (amphibians, reptile), brackish or euryhaline (ostracods, eurypterids, microconchids, fish), and marine (brachiopods, echinoderms) fossils.

== Paleobiota ==
According to thesis

Color key: Taxon / Reclassified taxon / Taxon falsely reported as present / Dubious taxon or junior synonym / Ichnotaxon / Ootaxon / Morphotaxon	Notes; Uncertain or tentative taxa are in small text; ~~crossed out~~ taxa are discredited.

=== Vertebrates ===
Vertebrates
Genus	Species	Notes	Images
Orthacanthus	O. platypternus	Elasmobranch in order Xenacanthida.	
Expleuracanthus	E. cf. E. parallelus	Elasmobranch in order Xenacanthida.	
Xenacanthus	Indeterminate	Elasmobranch in order Xenacanthida.	
Hamiltonichthys	H. mapesi	A Hybodont elasmobranch.	
Petalodus	Indeterminate	A petalodont holocephalian.	
Acanthodes	A. bridgei	An acanthodiform acanthodian.	
Elonichthys	Indeterminate	A palaeonisciform actinopterygian.	
"Feroniscus"	"F. hamiltoni"/"F. hamiltonensis"	A palaeonisciform actinopterygian, nomen nudum (Only described in thesis).	
Gnathorhiza	Indeterminate	A lungfish.	
Sagenodus	S. cf. copeanus	A lungfish.	
Eoscopus	E. lockardi	An amphibamiform temnospondyl.	
Euconcordia	E. cunninghami	A captorhinid.	
Spinoaequalis	S. schultzei	An early semi-aquatic diapsid.	
Archaeovenator	A. hamiltonensis	A varanopid.	
Eocasea	E. martini	A caseid synapsid.	
Ianthasaurus	I. cf. I. hardestii/hardestiorum	An edaphosaurid synapsid.	
?Lupeosaurus	Indeterminate	An edaphosaurid synapsid.	

=== Arthropods ===
Arthropods
Genus	Species	Notes	Images
Prothelyphonus	Indeterminate	A whip scorpion.	
Archaeoctonus	A. cf. A. glaber	A scorpion. Multiple papers misspelled as Archaeoctonous.	
Adelophthalmus	A. cf. A. mazonensis	An adelophthalmid eurypterid.	
Amphissites	Indeterminate	Ostracod.	
Geisina	Indeterminate	Ostracod.	
Gutschickia	Indeterminate	Ostracod.	
Bairdia	Indeterminate	Ostracod.	
Pseudobythocypris	Indeterminate	Ostracod.	
Carbonita	Indeterminate	Ostracod.	
Darwinula	Indeterminate	Ostracod.	
Paromylacris		A roachoid.	
Oedischia		An orthopteran.	
Meganeura		Meganisopteran.	
Titanophasma		Meganisopteran.	
Carrizopteryx		A palaeodictyopteran.	

=== Mollusks ===
Mollusks
Genus	Species	Notes	Images
Anthraconaia	Indeterminate	Myalinid bivalve.	
Myalinella	M. meeki	Myalinid bivalve.	
Permophorus	Indeterminate	A cardiid bivalve.	
Phestia	Indeterminate	A nuculanid bivalve.	
Schizodus	Indeterminate	A trigoniid bivalve.	
Bellerophon	Indeterminate	Bellerophontid gastropod.	
Euphemites	Indeterminate	Bellerophontid gastropod.	

=== Other animals ===
Other animals
Genus	Species	Notes	Images
Streptognathodus	Indeterminate	An ozarkodinid conodont.	
Apographiocrinus	A. cf. calycinus	Dendrocrinid crinoid.	
Delocrinus	D. cf. vulatus	Dendrocrinid crinoid.	
Plaxocrinus	P. cf. crassidiscus	Dendrocrinid crinoid.	
Serpula	Indeterminate	Annelid in order Canalipalpata.	
Spirorbis	Indeterminate	Annelid in order Canalipalpata.	
Punctospirifer	Indeterminate	Spiriferid brachiopod.	
Neospirifer	Indeterminate	Spiriferid brachiopod.	
Juresania	Indeterminate	Productid brachiopod.	
Antiquatonia	Indeterminate	Productid brachiopod.	
Kozlowskia	Indeterminate	Productid brachiopod.	
Neochonetes	Indeterminate	Productid brachiopod.	

=== Lycophytes and ferns ===
Lycophytes and ferns
Genus	Species	Notes	Images
Sigillaria	S. brardii	A tree-like lycophyte.	
Asterophyllites	A. equisetiformis, A. longiformis	Equisetid fern.	
Annularia	A. mucronata	Equisetid fern.	
Paleostachya	P. sp.	Equisetid fern.	

=== Seed ferns ===
Seed ferns
Genus	Species	Notes	Images
Sphenopteris	S. cf. S. germanica	A seed fern.	
"Callipteris"	C. conferta, C. flabellifora, C. scheibei	A seed fern in order Peltaspermales.	
Cyclopteris	Indeterminate	Seed plant in order Medullosales.	
Neuropteris	N. sp. (two species)	Seed plant in order Medullosales.	
Odontopteris	Indeterminate	Seed plant in order Medullosales.	
Trigonocarpus	Indeterminate	A seed fern seed.	

=== Gymnosperms ===
Gymnosperms
Genus	Species	Notes	Images
Cordaites	C. principalis	Gymnosperm in order Cordaitales.	
Cordaianthus	C. cf. pitcairniae	Gymnosperm in order Cordaitales.	
Samaropsis	S. fluitans	Gymnosperm in order Cordaitales.	
Emporia	E. cryptica, E. lockardii, E. royalii	Conifer in order Voltziales.	
Hanskerpia	H. hamiltonensis	Conifer in order Voltziales.	
Barthelia	B. furcata	Conifer in order Voltziales.	
Gomphostrobus	Indeterminate	Conifer in order Voltziales, stem and leaf.	
Walchia	W. hypnoides, W. piniformis, W. schneideri	Conifer in order Voltziales, leaves.	
Walchianathus	Indeterminate	Conifer in order Voltziales, male cone.	
Walchiastrobus	Indeterminate	Conifer in order Voltziales, female cone.	

=== Spores and Pollen ===
Gymnosperms
Genus	Species	Notes	Images
Leiotriletes	L. sp.	Spore microfossils.	
Calamospora	C. sp.	Spore microfossils.	
Triletes	T. sp.	Spore microfossils.	
Acanthoriletes	A. teretriangulatus	Spore microfossils.	
Nuskoisporites	N. trianguloris	Pollen microfossils.	
Potoniesporites	P. gtranulatus, P. neglectus	Pollen microfossils.	
Sulcatisporites	S. splendens, S. sp.	Pollen microfossils.	
Protohaploxypinus	P. samoilocichii	Pollen microfossils.	
Striatopodocarpites	S. sp (Two species)	Pollen microfossils.	
Hamiapollenites	H. perisporites, H. succatus	Pollen microfossils.	
Striatoabitites	S. multistriatus, S. sp.	Pollen microfossils.	
Alisporites	A. indarraensis, A. gracilis, A. nuthalensis	Pollen microfossils.	
Falcisporites	F. zapfei	Pollen microfossils.	
Limitisporites	L. sp.	Pollen microfossils.	
Lueckisporites	L. vickkiae	Pollen microfossils.	
Striatites	S. splendens	Pollen microfossils.	
Vittatina	V. cf. V. subsuccata, V. cf. V. verrucosa	Pollen microfossils.	

=== Fuslinids ===
Fuslinids
Genus	Species	Notes	Images
Globivalvulina	Indeterminate	Fusulinid in family Biseriamminidae.	
Dunbarinella	D. ervinensis	Fusulinid in family Schwagerinidae.	
Triticites	T. cullomensis, T. plummeri, T. ventricosus	Fusulinid in family Schwagerinidae.	
