= Kundaram Formation =

Geological formation in the Pranhita–Godavari Basin, India

- Stratigraphic range: Lopingian; ~259–252 Ma
- Type: Geological formation
- Sub-units: Lower and Upper Units
- Underlies: Kamthi Formation
- Overlies: Barakar Formation
- Thickness: 250–400 m

Lithology
- Primary: Mudstone, Sandstone
- Other: Shale

Location
- Coordinates: 19.071556°N 79.491173°E
- Region: Telangana
- Country: India
- Extent: Pranhita–Godavari Basin
- Kundaram Formation (India)

The Kundaram Formation is a geological formation in India, located within the Pranhita–Godavari Basin. The unit is between 250–400 metres thick and at its base consists of sandstone-mudstone alterations, followed by a sequence dominated by red mudstone with infrequent sandstone lens beds, with minor ferruginous shale within the sandstones. It was deposited in fluvial conditions. It is considered to be Late Permian in age. An abundant terrestrial fauna is known from nodules found near the village of Golleti in the Adilabad district of Telangana, the only such fauna known from the Permian of India. The fauna found includes the dicynodonts Endothiodon, Dicynodontoides, Pristerodon and Sauroscaptor, as well the small captorhinid Indosauriscus and an indeterminate medium-sized gorgonopsid.

== Paleobiota ==
=== Synapsids ===
Genus	Species	Location	Material	Notes	Images
Endothiodon	E. mahalanobisi	Telangana	Numerous almost complete specimens	A dicynodont.	
Endothiodon	E. bathystoma	Telangana	Numerous almost complete specimens	A dicynodont.	
Dicynodontoides	sp.	Telangana	ISI R 217	A dicynodont.	
Sauroscaptor	S. tharavati	Telangana		A dicynodont.	
Pristerodon	P. mackayi	Telangana		A dicynodont.	
?Oudenodon	sp.	Telangana		A dicynodont	
Gorgonopsia	Indeterminate	Telangana		A gorgonopsid.	

=== Reptiles ===
Genus	Species	Location	Material	Notes	Images
Indosauriscus	I. kuttyi	Telangana	Nearly complete Skulls from Several individuals.	A captorhinid reptile.	
