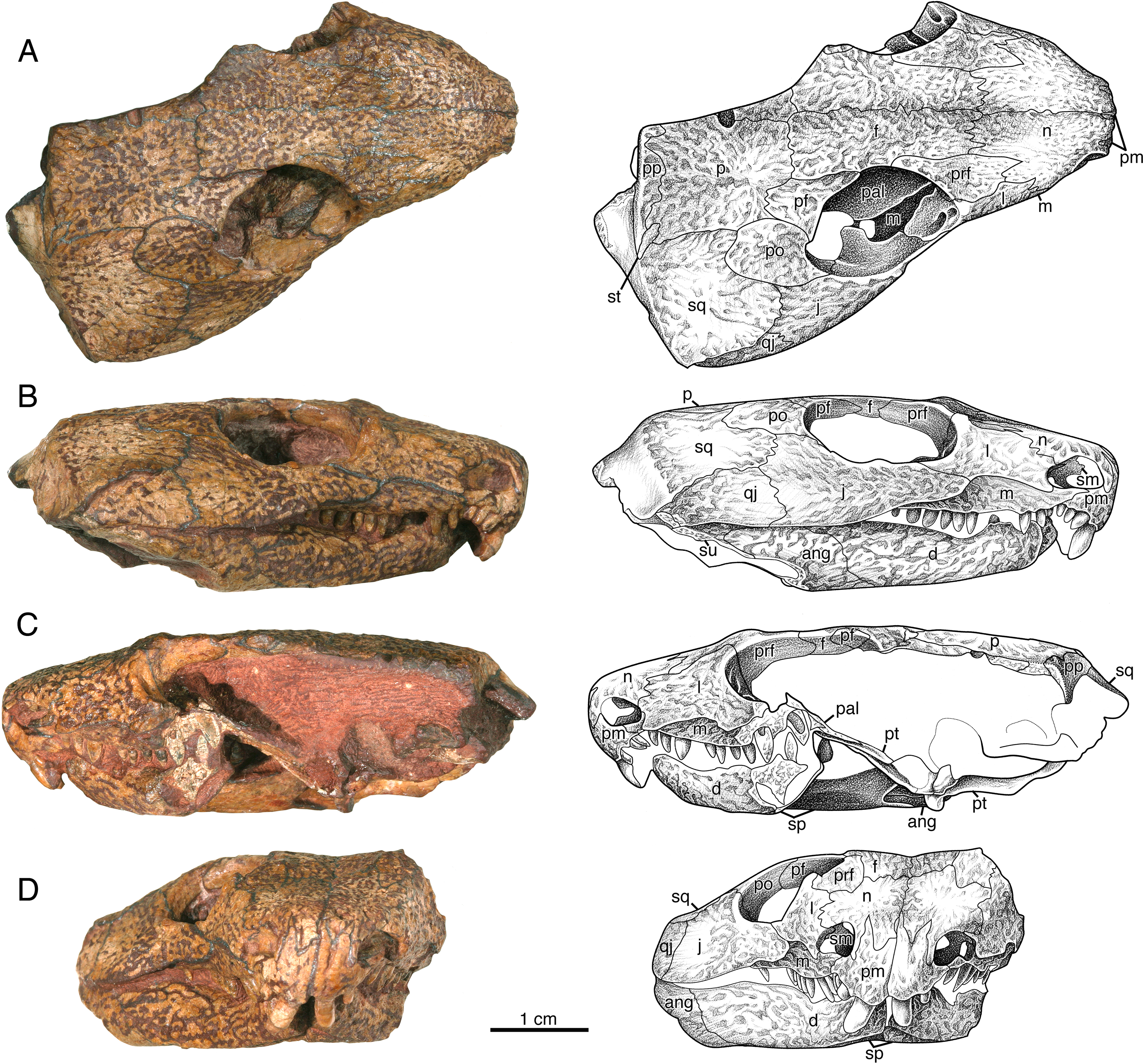
- Holotype skull in dorsal (A), right lateral (B), left lateral (C), and anterior (D) views

Scientific classification
- Kingdom: Animalia
- Phylum: Chordata
- Clade: Reptiliomorpha
- Family: †Captorhinidae
- Subfamily: †Moradisaurinae
- Genus: †Indosauriscus; Reisz et al., 2024
- Species: †I. kuttyi

Binomial name
- †Indosauriscus kuttyi Reisz et al., 2024

= Indosauriscus =

Indosauriscus Temporal range: Late Permian, Lopingian

Extinct genus of tetrapod

Indosauriscus (lit. 'Indian lizard') is an extinct genus of moradisaurine captorhinid tetrapod known from the late Permian (Lopingian epoch) Kundaram Formation of India. The genus is monotypic, with Indosauriscus kuttyi being the only known species.

== Discovery and naming ==
The holotype and referred specimens of Indosauricus were discovered by Tharavati S. Kutty in 1972 from rocks of the Pranhita–Godavari Basin that date to the Lopingian epoch of the upper Permian period.

In 2024, Robert R. Reisz, Sankar Chatterjee and Sean P. Modesto described these remains as a new genus and species of moradisaurine captorhinid, Indosauriscus kuttyi. The genus name, Indosauriscus, is derived from "Indo", after the country of India, "saurus", the Greek word for lizard, with "iscus" as a diminutive Latin suffix. The specific name "kuttyi" honours Tharavati S. Kutty, the discoverer of the specimens, for his contributions to vertebrate paleontology.

== Description ==
The skull of Indosauriscus has characteristics typical of a captorhinid reptile, with a procumbent snout and a larger premaxilla, temporal regions and postparietal bones being expanded transversely, tabular bone being absent, the squamosal having larger occipital flanges, having larger stapes, and a supratemporal bone being reduced in size.

It also has characteristics placing it in the subfamily Moradisaurinae, having two rows of bullet-like teeth on both maxilla and mandibles, reduced palatal dentition, larger contact between the parasphenoid and stapes, increased height of quadratojugal bone, and a postparietal bone that contributes to the skull roof. These features are also common in the skulls of Moradisaurus grandis and Labidosaurikos meachami, suggesting Indosauricus can be nested deeper into the subfamily.

=== Ontogenetic age ===
The skull lengths of Indosauriscus range from 39–54 mm (1.5–2.1 in). It was originally thought that due to this small skull size, all specimens might come from younger individuals, but the largest specimen, ISIR 233 (the holotype, skull length of 54 mm) has sutures between the frontals and nasals, frontals and parietals, and between the two frontals of the skull, which are a clear sign of skeletal maturity. Additional evidence suggesting skeletal maturity in the holotype is that the incisive process of the nasal extends ventrally along the dorsal process of the premaxilla and forms the anterior margin of the external naris; this characteristic is present in the larger, more mature specimens of Captorhinus laticeps.

== Classification ==
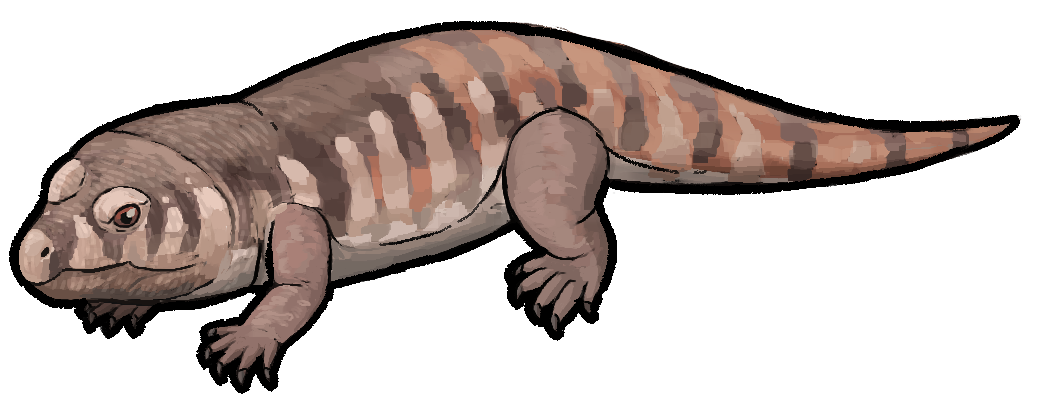
Speculative life restoration

Indosauriscus is classified as a member of the Captorhinidae in the subfamily Moradisaurinae.
