= Rhiodenticulatus =

Rhiodenticulatus Temporal range: Early Permian, Sakmarian

Scientific classification
- Kingdom: Animalia
- Phylum: Chordata
- Family: †Captorhinidae
- Genus: †Rhiodenticulatus; Berman & Reisz, 1986
- Species: †R. heatoni

Binomial name
- †Rhiodenticulatus heatoni Berman & Reisz, 1986

Extinct genus of tetrapods

Rhiodenticulatus is an extinct genus of Early Permian captorhinid known from Rio Arriba County, New Mexico of the United States.

== Description ==
Rhiodenticulatus is known from the holotype UCMP 35757, three-dimensionally preserved nearly complete skull and postcranial elements, and from the referred specimens, which come from a second individual, UCMP 40209 and UCMP 40210. All specimens were collected in the Camp Quarry (UCMP V-2814 locality), from the Cutler Formation of New Mexico, dating to the Sakmarian stage of the early Cisuralian Series.

It is small for a captorhinid, with a skull length of about 45 mm, and in most respects the skull is fairly primitive. However, it does have some unusual features; the lacrimal bone is very high dorsoventrally and so the snout has a domed appearance. The teeth are also unusual, in that the premaxillary teeth are homodont - most captorhinids had one large premaxillary tooth and several slightly smaller ones - and the middle maxillary teeth are uneven, with one about twice as wide at the base as the others but the same height. The postcranial bones show no differences to those of other captorhinids. It is fairly basal among captorhinids, as it only has one row of teeth, a slender supratemporal bone, and a comparatively large pineal foramen (relative to skull size), which are similar to the related basal species Procaptorhinus.

== Etymology ==
Rhiodenticulatus was first named by David S. Berman and Robert R. Reisz in 1986 and the type species is Rhiodenticulatus heatoni. The generic name is derived from Greek, meaning "peak with small teeth". The specific name honors the paleontologist Malcolm J. Heaton.
