= Acrodenta =

Acrodenta Temporal range: Late Permian, 260.5–255 Ma

Scientific classification
- Kingdom: Animalia
- Phylum: Chordata
- Family: †Captorhinidae
- Genus: †Acrodenta; Dutuit, 1976
- Species: †A. irerhi

Binomial name
- †Acrodenta irerhi Dutuit, 1976

Extinct genus of tetrapods

Acrodenta is an extinct genus of Late Permian captorhinid known from Marrakesh-Tensift-El Haouz of Morocco.

== Description ==
Acrodenta is known from the holotype MNHN ARG 506, formerly 69.Ir.1.JMD, a fragment of right maxilla. It was collected in the Douar of Irerhi locality from the Argana Formation (formerly known as the Tourbihine Member of the Ikakern Formation) of the Argana Basin, dating to the early-middle Wuchiapingian stage (or alternatively middle Tatarian stage) of the early Lopingian Series, about 260.5-255 million years ago.

== Etymology ==
Acrodenta was first named by Jean-Michel Dutuit in 1976 and the type species is Acrodenta irerhi. The generic name is derived from the Greek acra and denta, meaning is "high teeth". The specific name is named after its finding place Douar of Irerhi.
