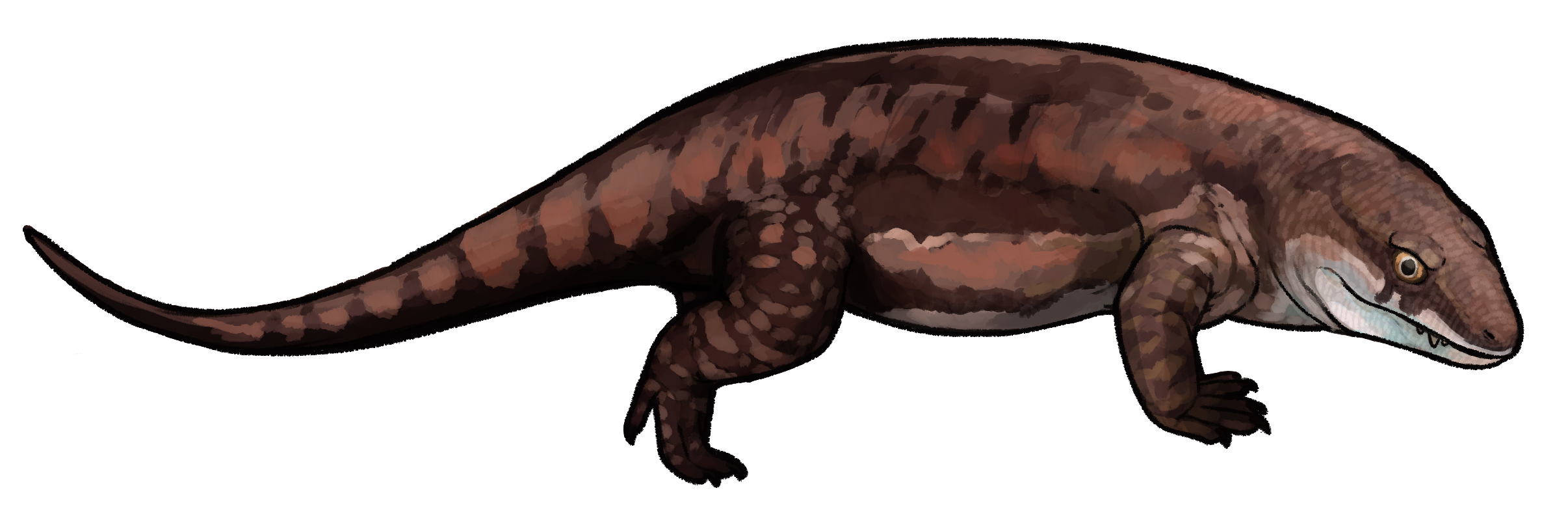
- Life restoration

Scientific classification
- Kingdom: Animalia
- Phylum: Chordata
- Family: †Captorhinidae
- Genus: †Rhodotheratus; Albright et al., 2021

Type species
- †Rhodotheratus parvus (Olson 1970)

Synonyms
- Captorhinikos parvus Olson 1970

= Rhodotheratus =

Rhodotheratus Temporal range: Early Permian

Extinct genus of tetrapod

Rhodotheratus is an extinct genus of captorhinid tetrapods from the Early Permian Hennessey Formation of Oklahoma, United States. The type species is Rhodotheratus parvus.
