= Baeotherates =

Baeotherates Temporal range: Early Permian, 289 Ma

Scientific classification
- Kingdom: Animalia
- Phylum: Chordata
- Family: †Captorhinidae
- Genus: †Baeotherates; May & Cifelli, 1998

Type species
- †Baeotherates fortsillensis May & Cifelli, 1998

Extinct genus of tetrapods

Baeotherates is an extinct genus of Early Permian captorhinid tetrapod known from Oklahoma, United States.

== Discovery ==
Baeotherates is known from the holotype OMNH 55758, a dentary bone from the right mandible. It was collected within the Dolese Brothers Limestone Quarry of Richard's Spur in Comanche County, Oklahoma and found in the Garber Formation of the Sumner Group, which dates to the middle Sakmarian stage of the Early Permian, about 289 ± 0.68 million years ago.

== Etymology ==
Baeotherates was first named by W. J. May and Richard L. Cifelli in 1998 and the type species is Baeotherates fortsillensis. The generic name means "small hunter". The specific name named after the military base Fort Sill near the type locality.
