= Balearosaurus =

Balearosaurus Temporal range: Permian

Scientific classification
- Domain: Eukaryota
- Kingdom: Animalia
- Phylum: Chordata
- Class: Reptilia
- Family: †Captorhinidae
- Subfamily: †Moradisaurinae
- Genus: †Balearosaurus; Matamales-Andreu et al., 2021

Type species
- †Balearosaurus bombardensis Matamales-Andreu et al., 2021

Extinct genus of reptiles

Balearosaurus is an extinct genus of moradisaurine captorhinid from the Permian of Spain. The type species is B. bombardensis.
