= Labidosauriscus =

Labidosauriscus Temporal range: Early Permian

Scientific classification
- Domain: Eukaryota
- Kingdom: Animalia
- Phylum: Chordata
- Class: Reptilia
- Family: †Captorhinidae
- Genus: †Labidosauriscus; Modesto, Scott & Reisz, 2018
- Species: †L. richardi

Binomial name
- †Labidosauriscus richardi Modesto, Scott & Reisz, 2018

Extinct genus of tetrapods

Labidosauriscus is an extinct genus of captorhinid tetrapods from the Permian period of North America. Fossils have been discovered in Oklahoma.
