= Gecatogomphius =

Gecatogomphius Temporal range: uppermost Lower Permian or lower Middle Permian, 272.5–268 Ma

Scientific classification
- Kingdom: Animalia
- Phylum: Chordata
- Family: †Captorhinidae
- Genus: †Gecatogomphius; Vjushkov & Chudinov, 1957
- Species: †G. kavejevi

Binomial name
- †Gecatogomphius kavejevi Vjushkov & Chudinov, 1957

Synonyms
- Hecatogomphius (lapsus calami)

Extinct genus of tetrapods

Gecatogomphius is an extinct genus of Middle Permian captorhinid with multiple tooth rows known from the Kirov Oblast and the Republic of Tatarstan of Russia.

== Description ==
Gecatogomphius is known from the holotype PIN 1156/1, a three-dimensionally preserved nearly complete lower jaw found on the bank of the Vyatka River near the town of Gorki in the Kirov Oblast, and from PIN 4310/1 a single maxillary tooth plate from Berezovye Polyanki in Tatarstan. The preserved part of the jawbone fragment has a length of 80 millimeters and is posteriorly expanded to form a very broad shelf that bears five rows of bulbous teeth.

Gecatogomphius is part of the biostratigraphic Ocher Assemblage which is characteristic for sediments of the East European Platform with an uppermost Lower Permian (Upper Kungurian) and lower Middle Permian (Roadian) age.

== Etymology ==
Gecatogomphius was first named by B. P. Vjushkov and Pjotr K. Chudinov in 1957 and the type species is Gecatogomphius kavejevi. The generic name is derived from hecato, Greek for "hundred", and gomphos, Greek for "peg", "nail" or "wedge", referring to the large number of teeth in the jaw. The specific name kavejevi is in honour of the finder of the type specimen, the Soviet geologist Mazit S. Kaveev.
