= Saurorictus =

Saurorictus Temporal range: Late Permian, 260.5–255 Ma

Scientific classification
- Domain: Eukaryota
- Kingdom: Animalia
- Phylum: Chordata
- Class: Reptilia
- Family: †Captorhinidae
- Genus: †Saurorictus; Modesto & Smith, 2001
- Species: †S. australis

Binomial name
- †Saurorictus australis Modesto & Smith, 2001

Extinct genus of tetrapods

Saurorictus is an extinct genus of Late Permian captorhinid known from Western Cape Province of South Africa.

== Description ==
Saurorictus is known from the holotype SAM PK-8666, three-dimensionally preserved nearly complete skull and few postcranial fragments. The skull has a length of 22 millimeters, thus Saurorictus has been estimated to have been about 15 cm (5.9 in) in length. This specimen represents one of the most complete captorhinid from the Late Permian.

It was collected from the Hoedemaker Member, Teekloof Formation of the lower Beaufort Group, dating to the early-middle Wuchiapingian stage (or alternatively middle Tatarian stage) of the early Lopingian Series, about 260.5-255 million years ago. It was found in the Leeukloof 43 farm in the Beaufort West District of the Western Cape Province and referred to the Tropidostoma Assemblage Zone.

== Etymology ==
Saurorictus was first named by Sean P. Modesto and Roger M. H. Smith in 2001 and the type species is Saurorictus australis. The generic name is derived from sauros, Greek for "lizard", and rictus, Latin for "display of teeth" or "smile", thus the meaning is "lizard-smile". The specific name australis, meaning "southern", refers to the fact that this is the southernmost captorhinid to date.
