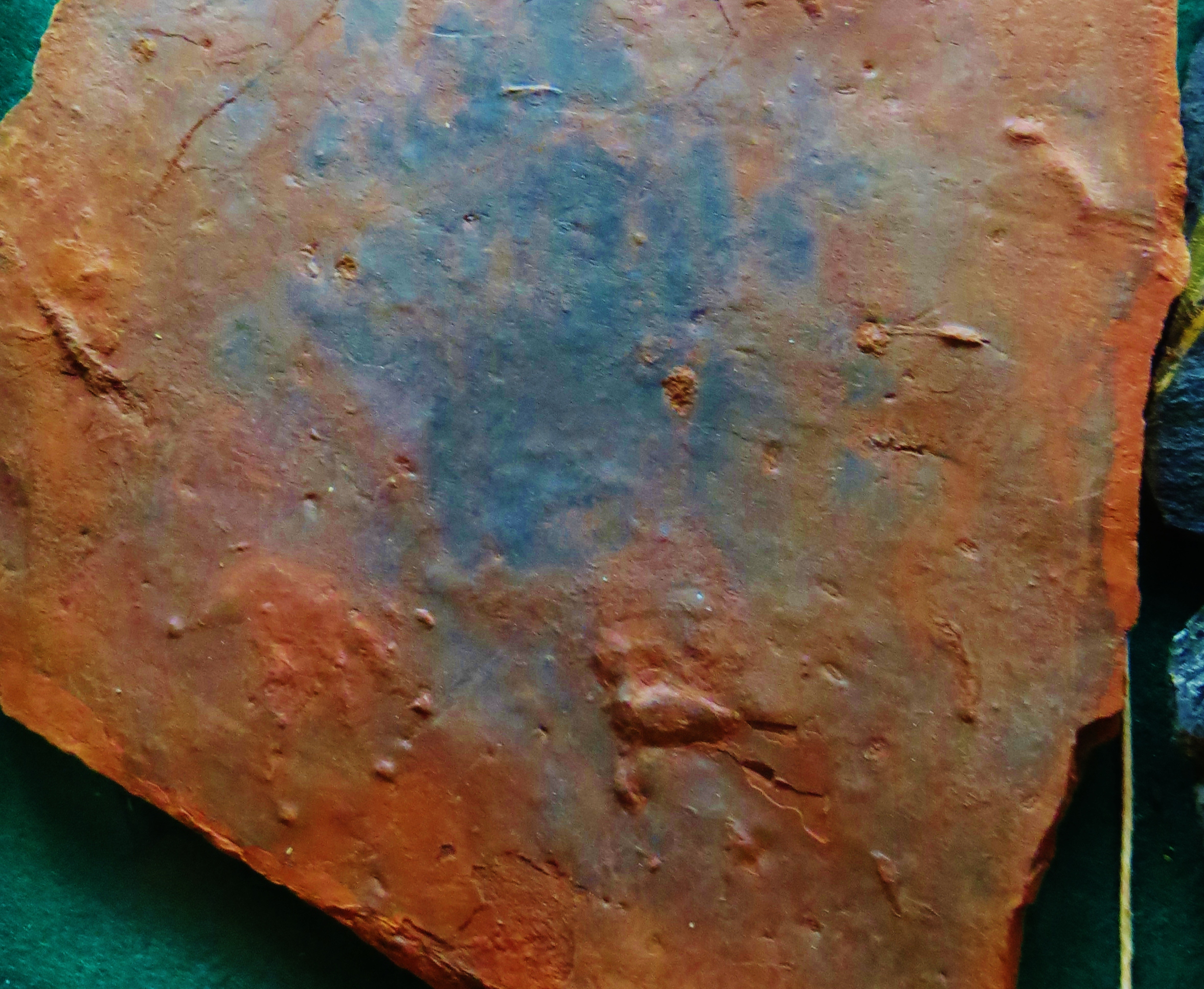
- H. major

Trace fossil classification
- Kingdom: Animalia
- Phylum: Chordata
- Family: †Captorhinidae
- Subfamily: †Moradisaurinae
- Ichnogenus: †Hyloidichnus; Gilmore 1927

Type ichnospecies
- H. bifurcatus Gilmore 1927

Ichnospecies
- D. bifurcatus Gilmore 1927; type; D. major Heyler and Lessertisseur 1963; D. minor Heyler and Lessertisseur 1963; D. tirolensis Ceoloni et al. 1988; D. triasicus Biron and Dutuit 1981

= Hyloidichnus =

Hyloidichnus Temporal range: Permian-Triassic

Trace fossil

Hyloidichnus is a reptile ichnogenus commonly found in assemblages of ichnofossils dating to the Permian to Triassic in North America, Africa, South America, and Europe.

The animal that created the tracks was most likely from the subfamily Moradisaurinae, a group of lizard-like reptiles.
