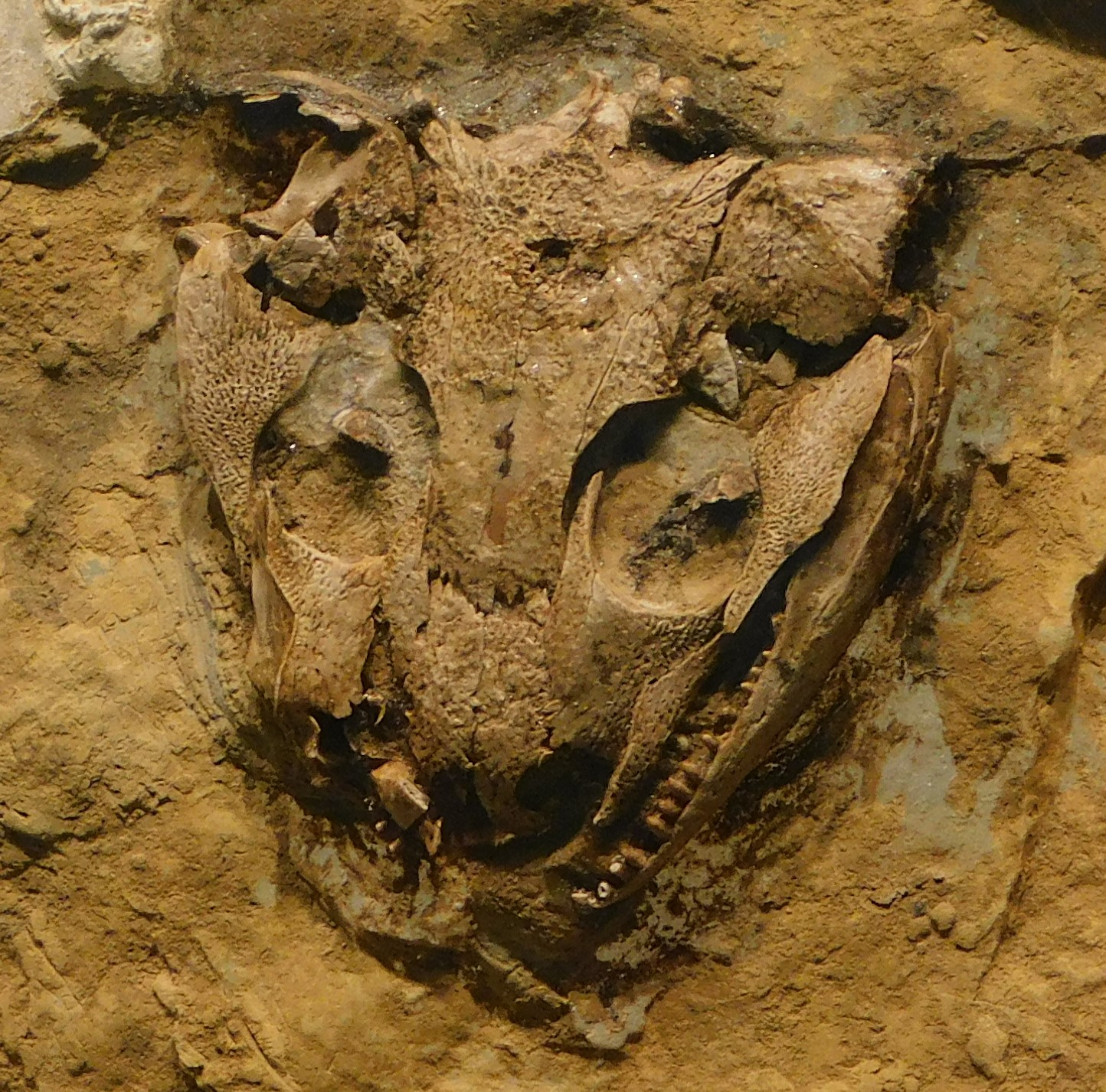
- Holotype skull

Scientific classification
- Domain: Eukaryota
- Kingdom: Animalia
- Phylum: Chordata
- Class: Reptilia
- Family: †Captorhinidae
- Genus: †Euconcordia; Reisz, Haridy & Müller, 2016
- Species: †E. cunninghami

Binomial name
- †Euconcordia cunninghami (Müller & Reisz, 2005)

Synonyms
- Concordia Müller & Reisz, 2005 (preoccupied)

= Euconcordia =

Euconcordia Temporal range: Late Carboniferous, 300 Ma

Extinct genus of reptiles

Euconcordia is an extinct genus of Late Carboniferous captorhinid known from Greenwood County, Kansas of the United States.

== Description ==
Euconcordia is known from the holotype KUVP 8702a&b, well preserved skull in dorsal view along with its counterpart, a partial preserved braincase in ventral view, and from the referred specimen KUVP 96/95, well preserved skull in ventral view and a poorly preserved dorsal counterpart. It was collected in the Hamilton Quarry, from the Calhouns Shale Formation of the Shawnee Group, dating to the Virgilian stage (or alternatively late Kasimovian to early Gzhelian stage) of the Late Pennsylvanian Series, about 300 million years ago. Euconcordia was originally thought to be the basalmost known member of Captorhinidae. A novel phylogenic study of primitive reptile relationships by Müller & Reisz in 2006 recovered Thuringothyris as a sister taxon of the Captorhinidae, and therefore, by definition, Thuringothyris represents the basalmost known captorhinid. The same results were obtained in later phylogenic analyses. Euconcordia is still the earliest known captorhinid as all other captorhinid taxa are known only from Permian deposits.

== Etymology ==
Euconcordia was first named by Johannes Müller and Robert R. Reisz in 2005. Its original generic name was Concordia and the type species is Concordia cunninghami. The original generic name was derived from the Latin concordia, meaning "unity" or "harmony". The specific name honors Christopher R. Cunningham for studying this taxon as part of his PhD thesis on the Hamilton Quarry. The original generic name turned out to be preoccupied by extant hippolytid crustacean Concordia Kingsley, 1880 (currently considered a junior synonym of Latreutes Stimpson, 1860). Reisz, Haridy & Müller (2016) coined a replacement name Euconcordia.
