= Romeria (reptile) =

Romeria Temporal range: Early Permian, 299–294.6 Ma

Scientific classification
- Domain: Eukaryota
- Kingdom: Animalia
- Phylum: Chordata
- Class: Reptilia
- Family: †Captorhinidae
- Genus: †Romeria; Price, 1937

Species
- †R. texana Price, 1937; †R. prima (Clark & Carroll, 1973)

Extinct genus of tetrapods

Romeria is an extinct genus of Early Permian captorhinid known from Texas of the United States. It was first named by Llewellyn Ivor Price in 1937 and the type species is Romeria texana. R. texana is known from the holotype MCZ 1480, a three-dimensionally preserved skull. It was collected in the Archer City Bonebed 1 site, from the Archer City Formation, dating to the Asselian stage of the Cisuralian epoch, about 299–294.6 million years ago. A second species, Romeria primus, was first named by Clark and Carroll in 1973. In 1979, it was corrected as Romeria prima by Heaton. R. prima is known from the holotype MCZ 1963, a three-dimensionally preserved skull. It was collected in the Cottonwood Creek site, from the same horizon as the type species.
