= Protocaptorhinus =

Protocaptorhinus Temporal range: Early Permian

Scientific classification
- Kingdom: Animalia
- Phylum: Chordata
- Family: †Captorhinidae
- Genus: †Protocaptorhinus; Clark & Carroll, 1973
- Species: †P. pricei

Binomial name
- †Protocaptorhinus pricei Clark & Carroll, 1973

Extinct genus of tetrapods

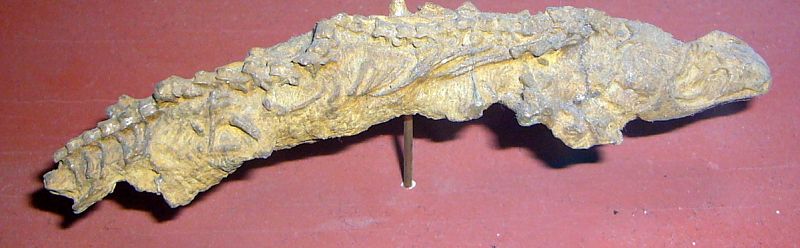
Protocaptorhinus pricei fossil

Protocaptorhinus is an extinct genus of Early Permian (Cisuralian epoch) captorhinid tetrapods known from Texas of the United States. It is known from the holotype MCZ 1478, a three-dimensionally preserved partial skull. It was collected in the Rattlesnake Canyon site from the Nocona Formation. It was first named by Clark and Carroll in 1973 and the type species is Protocaptorhinus pricei. The generic name means "first Captorhinus" (from Greek) and the specific name honours Llewellyn Ivor Price.

== See also ==
- Geology of Wichita Falls, Texas
