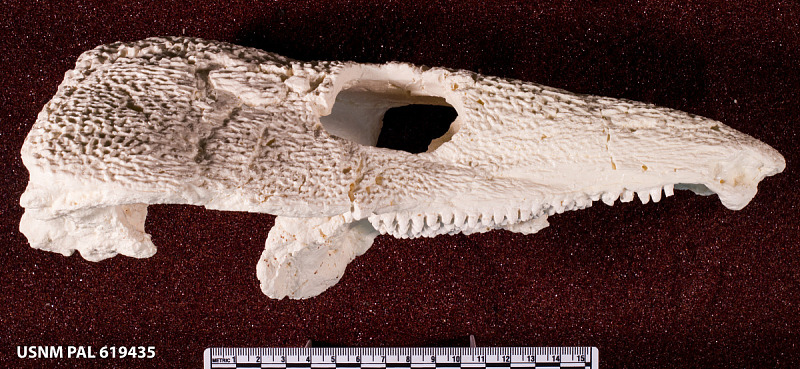

Scientific classification
- Domain: Eukaryota
- Kingdom: Animalia
- Phylum: Chordata
- Class: Reptilia
- Family: †Captorhinidae
- Subfamily: †Moradisaurinae
- Genus: †Labidosaurikos; Stovall, 1950

Species
- †L. meachami (type) Stovall, 1950

= Labidosaurikos =

Labidosaurikos Temporal range: Early Permian, 279–272 Ma

Extinct genus of tetrapods

Labidosaurikos is a genus of extinct captorhinid tetrapods that lived around 279 to 272 million years ago during Kungurian age of the lower Permian. The American paleontologist John Willis Stovall first described Labidosaurikos in 1950, naming it "Labidosaurus like" for the striking similarity of the holotype skull of his specimen to the cranial anatomy of another captorhinid Labidosaurus hamatus.

Labidosaurikos is an important find in Permian red beds of North America, where captorhinids are commonly found, as it is a key discovery in the evolution of herbivory in large captorhinids given its multi-row tooth plates. This is a characteristic it does not share with its name-sake Labidosaurus hamatus whose dentition resembles more basal, mainly single-tooth-rowed forms. The first fossils of Labidosaurikos came from Oklahoma and later finds were discovered in Texas.

Most information attributed to Labidosaurikos is based on the cranial anatomy of the only well supported species Labidosaurikos meachami as there are no collections of the appendicular skeleton. Captorhinid anatomy and interrelationships are known primarily from other lower Permian genera such as Romeria, Protocaptorhinus, Rhiodenticulatus, Captorhinus and Labidosaurus. Labidosaurikos is a part of a less well known collection of captorhinids from younger Permian deposits, Moradisaurus is an example.

== Description ==
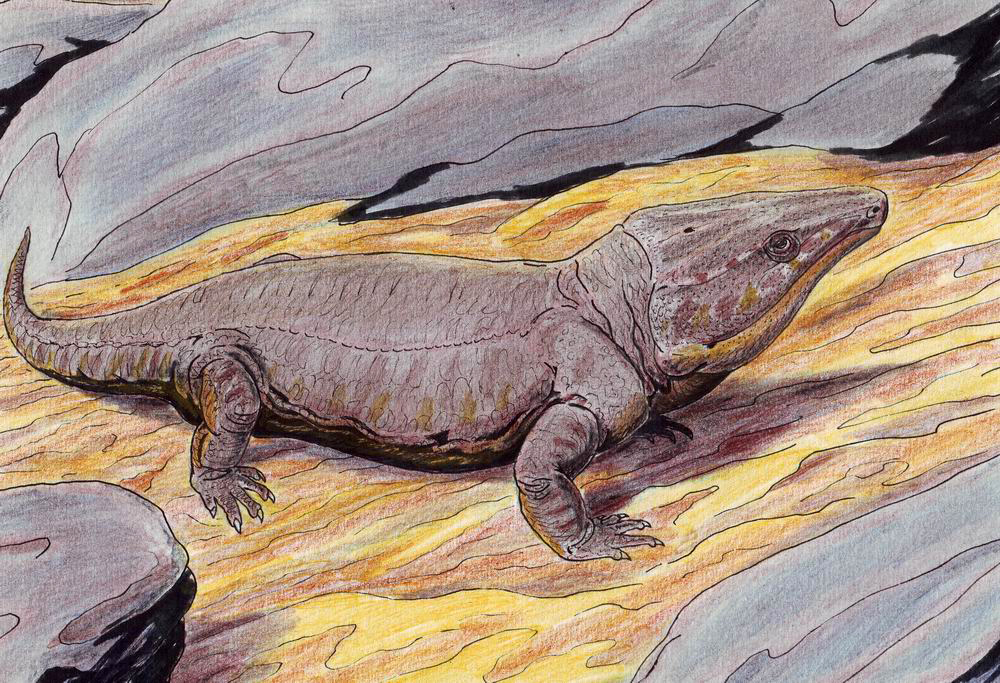
Restoration

Labidosaurikos was a large herbivorous tetrapod. Its skull was anapsid (lacking temporal fenestrae) and heavily ornamented, with a hooked snout characteristic of all captorhinids. The consensus on representative species of the genus Labidosaurikos is Labidosaurikos meachami as this is the proposed species type with the most complete fossil skull and jaw. Estimations of body length come in at about 1.3 meters based on ratios of body length to skull length in other large herbivorous captorhinids like Captorhinus aguti. However most anatomical descriptions are limited by the fact that only skulls and cranial and mandible fragments make up the fossil record. Without appendicular skeleton or fragments there cannot be evidence-based description of more morphology aside from the skull.

=== Skull ===
Of the Labidosaurikos fossil collection the largest adult skull specimen was 280 mm (11 in) making it the second largest captorhinid compared to Moradisaurus gandis, a fellow member of the multiple rowed tooth plate captorhinid subfamily Moradisaurinae. Labidosaurikos skull has broadly flared posterior cheeks that are seen in all other multitoothed taxa as well as its Labidosaurus name sake. The foramens present on the skull include a pineal foramen on dorsal plane and the orbits and external naires that are elliptical in appearance.

On the skull roof the frontal bones are little more than a third of the total length of the skull and have parallel sided that terminate posteriorly on a connection perpendicular to the antero-posterior axis. In addition Labidosaurikos characteristically long and slender Prefrontals with lacrimals that are wide and narrow moving anteriorly towards the nares are key characters for which the initial resemblance to Labidosaurus was noted. A captorhinid feature, the long hooked snout consists of a long overlapping junction between nasal and lacrimal bones although the nasal is slightly broader than those of most other captorhinids and extends ventrolaterally slightly more than half-way down the snout. More posterior features includes post frontals and post orbitals that are comparatively short and differ only slightly in size. The parietals are described as arched and the pair of parietals give the skull roof a slightly domed appearance unlike the parietals of other captorhinids. Each one of the parietals is bowed parasaggitally and overlaps sutures of several skull roof elements. When examining these overlapping skull roof elements and the dorsal portion of the skull as a whole there is significant dermal sculpturing. Large pits surround the post parietal suture and are deeper than all other pits that occur on the skull.

=== Palate and dentition ===
The palate of Labidosaurikos shares a general resemblance to the captorhinid pattern however; there are some specializations that come with the presence of multiple rows of teeth. Some of these features include transverse constriction of the palate by medially expanding tooth laminae of the maxillae and the loss of teeth from the palatine and anterior process of the pterygoid. The vomer is exceptionally slender, long and smoothly convex anteriorly which is a trait shared by Moradisaurus.

The anteroventrally directed premaxillae which contain five long premaxillary teeth that decrease in size posteriorly as is the case in other captorhinids. The maxilla is greatly enlarged medially this constricts the palate and forms a tooth plate that accommodates the 6 parallel rows of teeth. Teeth that occur in the maxilla have been considered isodonts. The lateral surface of the maxilla presents a lateral flexion that is a characteristic cheek swelling seen in the single rowed Labidosaurus, Captorhinus aguti and other multi rowed genus. In addition the septomaxilla is characteristic of the family group, however it sports a sculptured postero-dorsal process extending onto the skull roof to insert between lacrimal and nasal.

Much like expansion in the maxillae the dentaries expand transversely on the alveolar accommodate multiple rows of teeth. These 6 rows conical peg like teeth occur on medially expanded on both maxillae and dentaries.

== Paeloenviornmental information and paleobiology ==
=== Environment ===
Labidosaurikos specimens have been found in Permian red beds of North American. Specimens have been found within Hennessey shale in Crescent, Oklahoma as well as the Lower Vale, Choza, and Arroyo Formations in northern central Texas. These locations have yielded critical information about early tetrapod evolution and Captorhinids are extremely common in these deposits. All locations have been correlated with each other to be formed in the Lower Permian sometime within the Kungurian. The colored beds with alternating distinctive red-green margins are formed by nonmarine and marine series of sediments that were deposited contemporaneously over time. The alternative sedimentation indicates the environment Labidosaurikos inhabited were the margins of the aquatic reservoirs that were plentiful in these areas during early Permian time and were able support substantial flora.

=== Feeding/diet ===
One of the few aspects of Labidosaurikos biology and behavior that can be inferred from the limited fossil record is the diet. Morphology of the multi rowed dentition and aspects of the skull support the hypothesis of herbivorous diet.

Morphology of the dentition shows the tooth plate teeth are relatively small isodonts and have wear facets usually characteristic of grinding. Mandibular tooth rows rest between the maxillary tooth rows and have multiple contact points that could in motion pass one another which is necessary characteristic to shred fibrous plant material. However this would require propalinal jaw motion. Striations on the wear facets of the teeth can normally be used to determine jaw motion however they are not present on Labidosaurikos was secondary non-dental evidence is required. The ability of the quadrate to slide antero-posteriorly over the articular propaliny however the holotype skull provided by Stovall had damaged the articulating surface. Propaliny is evident two other captorhinids, one called Moradisaurus shares membership in the subfamily Moradisaurinae with Labidosaurikos. The morphology of the articular for Moradisaurus does indicate Labidosaurikos may have been capable of propaliny because articular fragments show great similarity to Moradisaurus than more basal captorhinids.

Other osteological evidence for herbivorous feeding via propaliny in Labidosaurikos is vaulted skull roof, a feature that is significantly different from Labidosaurus, Captorhinus, and other more basal captorhinids. This feature is reflected by a posterior expansion of the occipital flange of the squamosal, suggesting muscle fibers originate in the mandible. These muscle fibers would insert into the coronoid process at an angle of 45 degrees to horizontal forming an arrangement that supports the lower jaw being drawn posteriorly thus enabling propaliny.

== Discovery and classification ==
The first Labidosaurikos skull was discovered around 1939 in Hennessey shale in Crescent Oklahoma and was presented to John. W Stovall, however he did not name or introduce it to paleontology until 1950 due to his own sickness. To this day this first skull is one of the best-preserved specimens of Labidosaurikos. This initial specimen and species type introduced and named by Stovall was Labidosaurikos meachami for its likeness to Labidosaurus and the species name was a tribute to a Dean at the University of Oklahoma named E.D Meacham. Everett Claire Olson was believed to have discovered a second species of Labidosaurikos, L. barkeri, in 1949 in the upper layer of the Clear Fork Group or the "Choza Formation" in North Texas. L. barkeri differs from L. meachami in having one less row of teeth in both maxillary and dentary, however, the validity of its classification critiqued in 1959 by R. J. Seltin who thought the size difference between specimens may indicate that the tooth row disparity was an age related developmental difference. In 1988 R.L Carol designated parent taxa as identified as Captorhinidae.

The classification of Labidosaurikos has had some discrepancy based on the debate of multiple rowed teeth having evolved once or twice independently in captorhinids. Cladistics analysis of the relationships of Captorhinids originally placed all the large multi-row toothed members in a monophyletic group with Captorhinus aguti based solely on dentition as it also shared multi-rowed teeth ideal for herbivory. More derived captorhinids are usually larger than the more basal groups and this drove the hypothesis that multi row captorhinids were monophyletic group. However more recent complete analysis of cranial anatomy of Labidosaurikos in 1995 revealed that in addition to being more similar in size to Labidosaurus than Captorhinus, there was striking cranial similarity including but not limited to synapomorphies such as the narrow snout, long and narrow anterior process of the frontal. In combination with another single rowed Captorhinus, Eocaptorhinus that was only distinguishable from Captorhinus aguti by the presence single row of teeth. New cladistics analysis given this information supported the hypothesis that origin of multiple-tooth-rows in Captorhinidae is diphyletic and that Labidosaurikos is more closely related to single row Labidosaurus than Captorhinus aguti.
