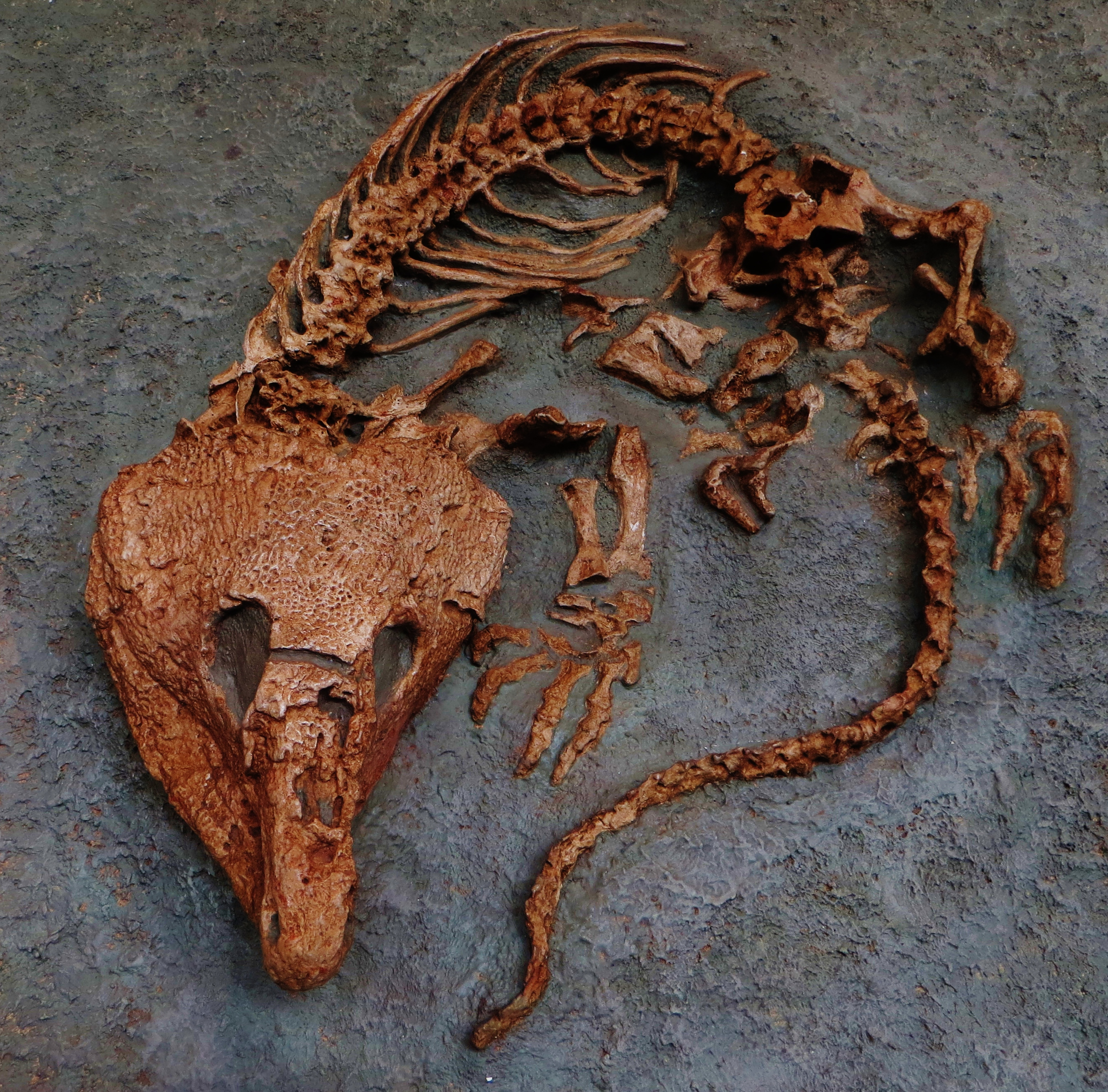
- Fossil

Scientific classification
- Domain: Eukaryota
- Kingdom: Animalia
- Phylum: Chordata
- Class: Reptilia
- Family: †Captorhinidae
- Genus: †Labidosaurus; Cope, 1896
- Species: †L. hamatus

Binomial name
- †Labidosaurus hamatus (Cope, 1895)

= Labidosaurus =

Labidosaurus Temporal range: Early Permian

Extinct genus of tetrapods

Labidosaurus (from Greek: λᾰβῐ́δος lăbĭdos, 'forceps' and Greek: σαῦρος saûros, 'lizard') is an extinct genus of captorhinid tetrapods from the Permian period of North America. Fossils have been discovered in Texas.

It was heavily built, resembling a lizard with a large head, and measuring about 75 centimetres (30 in) long. Like most captorhinids, it was probably quadrupedal. Unlike many other captorhinids it had a single row of sharp, conical teeth in its jaws, and its dietary habits are assumed to have been omnivorous.

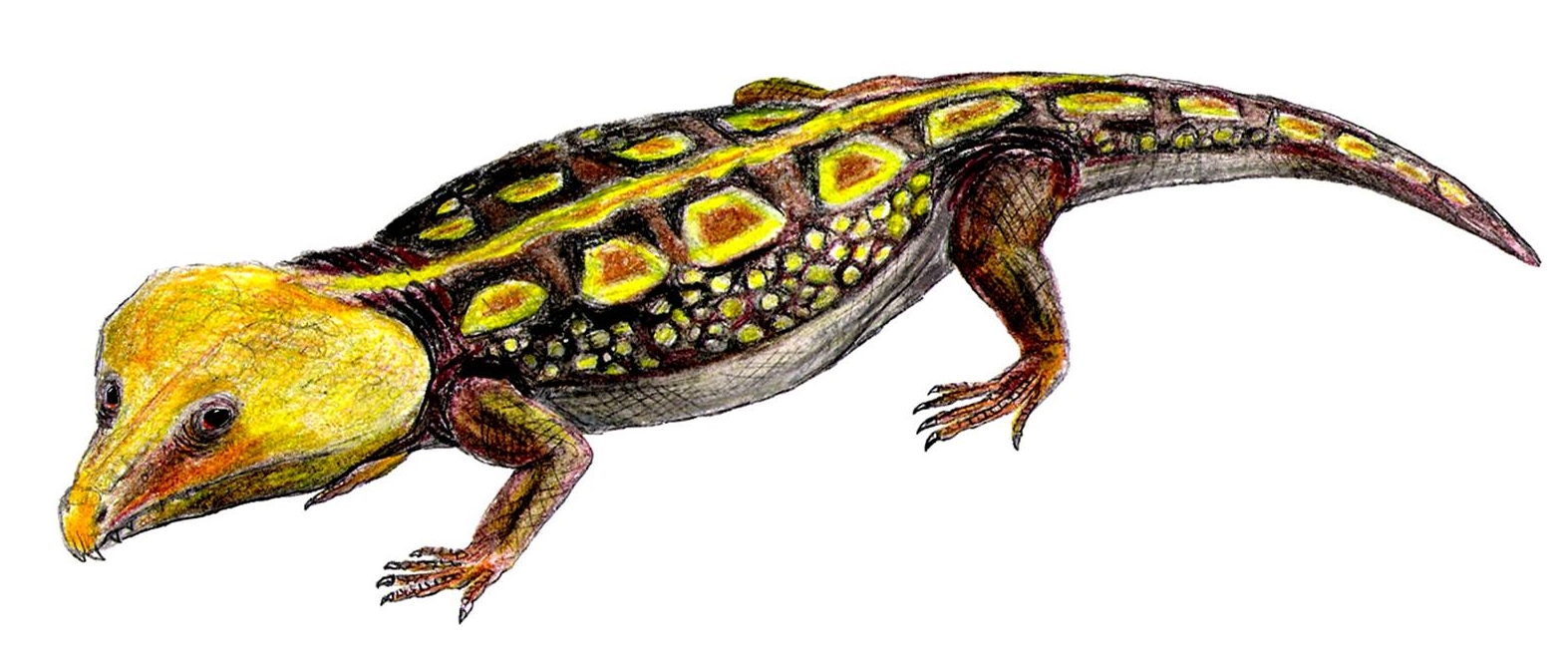
Life restoration

A lower jaw of Labidosaurus was described in 2011 that shows evidence of osteomyelitis, or an infection of the bone. It is the earliest known example of an infection in a land vertebrate. The infection probably developed because the pulp cavity of a broken dentary tooth was exposed to bacteria. Although another tooth would have replaced the broken one, regeneration would have been slow. Labidosaurus and other derived captorhinids had teeth that were deeply implanted in the jaws. This deep implantation limited tooth replacement, meaning that a broken tooth would have been exposed for a long period of time.
