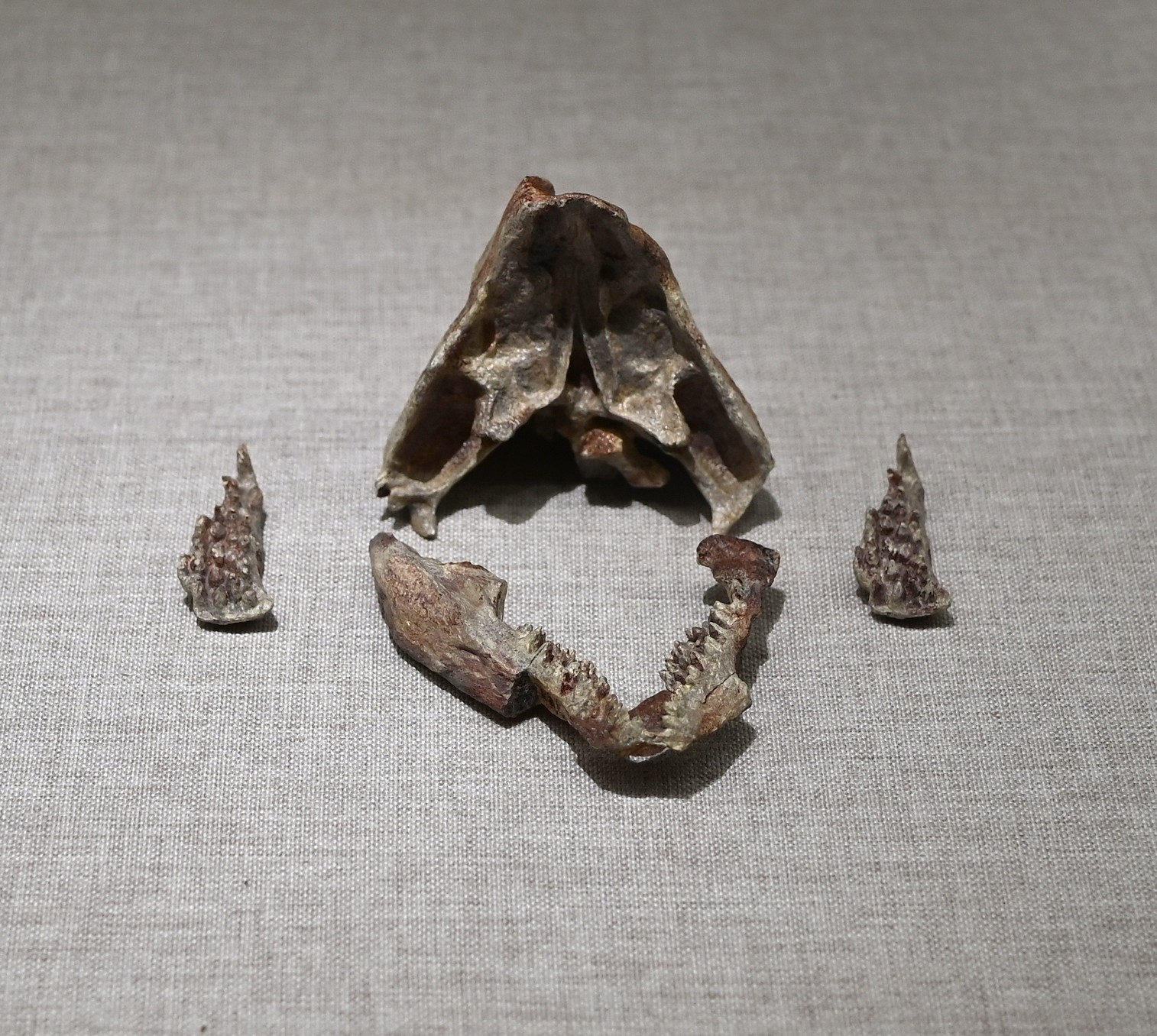
- Holotype skull of G. naobaogouensis, Baoding Natural History Museum

Scientific classification
- Kingdom: Animalia
- Phylum: Chordata
- Family: †Captorhinidae
- Subfamily: †Moradisaurinae
- Genus: †Gansurhinus; Reisz et al., 2011

Species
- † G. naobaogouensis Liu, 2023; †G. qingtoushanensis Reisz et al., 2011 (type)

= Gansurhinus =

Gansurhinus Temporal range: Guadalupian–Lopingian

Extinct genus of tetrapods

Gansurhinus is an extinct genus of moradisaurine captorhinid known from the Middle Permian Qingtoushan Formation of the Qilian Mountains and the Late Permian Naobaogou Formation in the Daqing Mountains of China. It was first named by Robert R. Reisz, Jun Liu, Jin-Ling Li and Johannes Müller in 2011 and the type species is Gansurhinus qingtoushanensis. A second species, Gansurhinus naobaogouensis, was described in 2023 based on a relatively complete skeleton of an immature individual.
