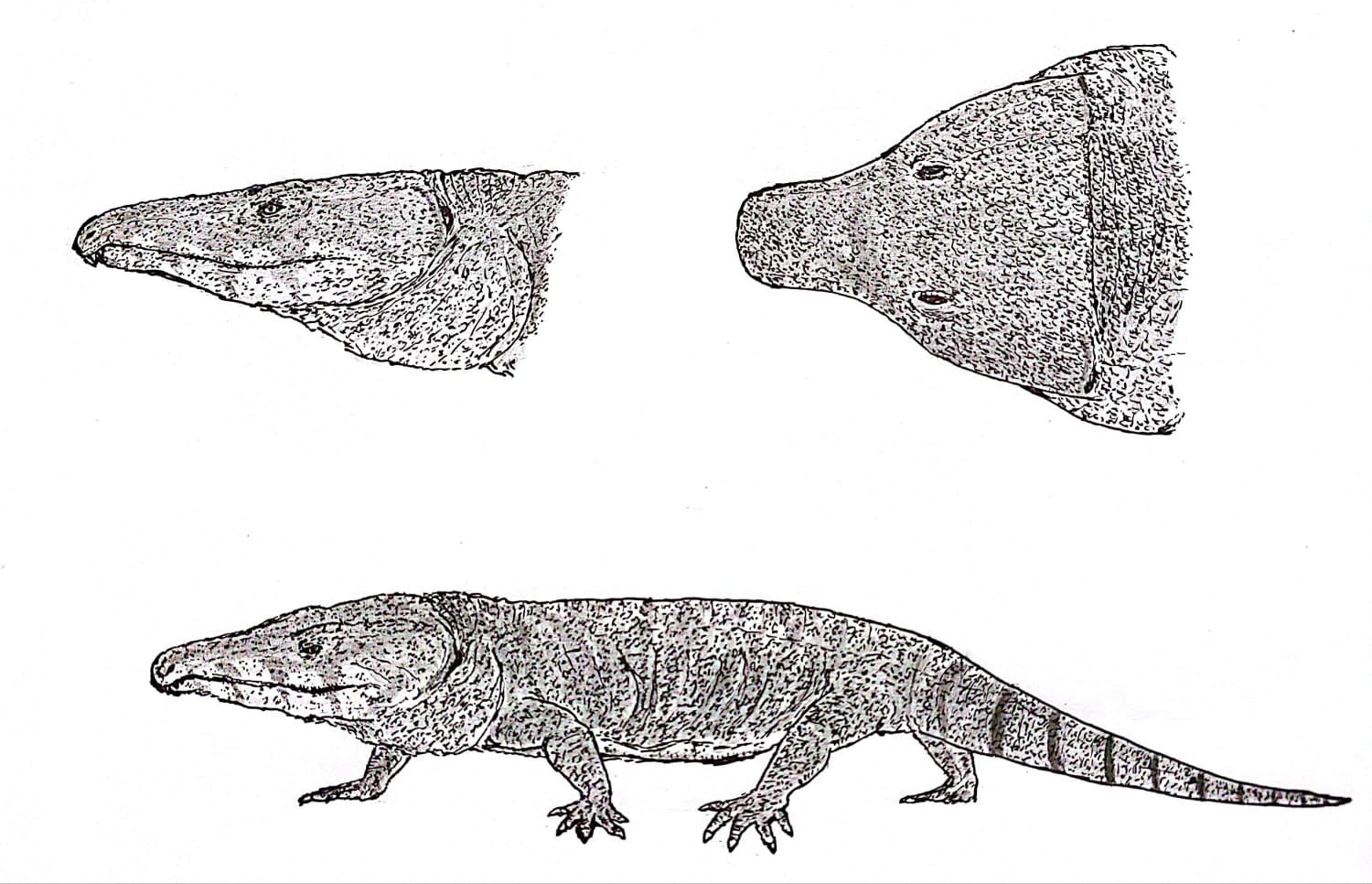
- Reconstruction of Moradisaurus grandis from different angles
- Approximate size compared to a human

Scientific classification
- Kingdom: Animalia
- Phylum: Chordata
- Family: †Captorhinidae
- Subfamily: †Moradisaurinae
- Genus: †Moradisaurus; Taquet, 1969

Type species
- †Moradisaurus grandis Taquet, 1969

= Moradisaurus =

Moradisaurus Temporal range: Lopingian

Extinct genus of large captorhinid tetrapods

Moradisaurus is an extinct genus of large captorhinid tetrapods, with a single species Moradisaurus grandis, known from the late Permian (Lopingian) aged Moradi Formation of Niger. It is the largest captorhinid known, estimated to have reached a snout-vent length of over two metres. Similar to other members of Moradisaurinae, it possessed multiple tooth rows, which is associated with a high-fiber herbivorous diet.

The holotype is MNHN MRD1, a skull that was discovered during the late 1960s.
