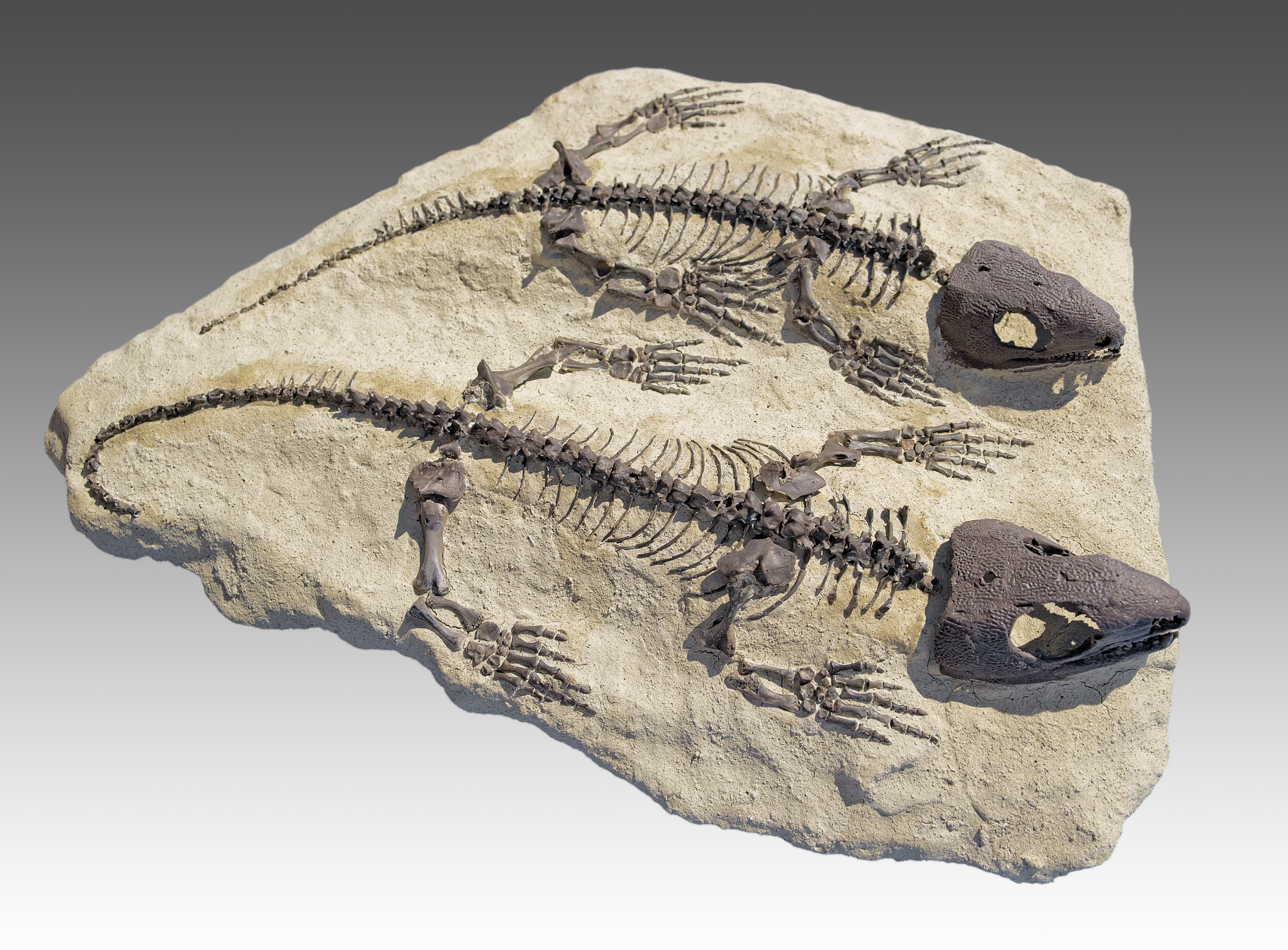
- Fossil Captorhinus specimens

Scientific classification
- Kingdom: Animalia
- Phylum: Chordata
- Clade: Reptiliomorpha
- Family: †Captorhinidae; Case, 1911

Type species
- †Captorhinus aguti Cope, 1895

Genera
- See text

Synonyms
- Romeriidae Price, 1937

= Captorhinidae =

Captorhinids Temporal range: Pennsylvanian - Lopingian 300–252 Ma

Extinct family of tetrapods

Captorhinidae is an extinct family of tetrapods, traditionally considered primitive reptiles, known from the late Carboniferous to the Late Permian. They had a cosmopolitan distribution across Pangea. They ecologically ranged from small carnivores to large herbivores.

== Description ==
Size of Captorhinus compared to a human

Size of Moradisaurus, the largest known captorhinid, compared to a human

Captorhinids are a clade of small to very large lizard-like animals that date from the Late Carboniferous through the Permian. Their skulls were much stronger than those of their relatives, the protorothyridids, and had teeth that were better able to deal with tough plant material. The postcranial skeleton is similar to those of seymouriamorphs and diadectomorphs; these animals were grouped together with the captorhinids in the order Cotylosauria as the first reptiles in the early 20th century, but are now usually regarded as stem-amniotes no closer to reptiles than to mammals. Captorhinids have broad, robust skulls that are generally triangular in shape when seen in dorsal view. The premaxillae are characteristically downturned. The largest captorhinid, the herbivorous Moradisaurus, could reach an estimated snout-vent length (head and body length) of 2 meters (6.5 feet). Early, smaller forms possessed single rows of teeth, and were likely carnivorous or omnivorous, while the larger, more derived captorhinids belonging to the subfamily Moradisaurinae were herbivorous and developed multiple (up to 11) rows of teeth in the jaws alongside propalinal (back and forth) jaw motion, which created an effective apparatus for grinding and shredding plant matter.

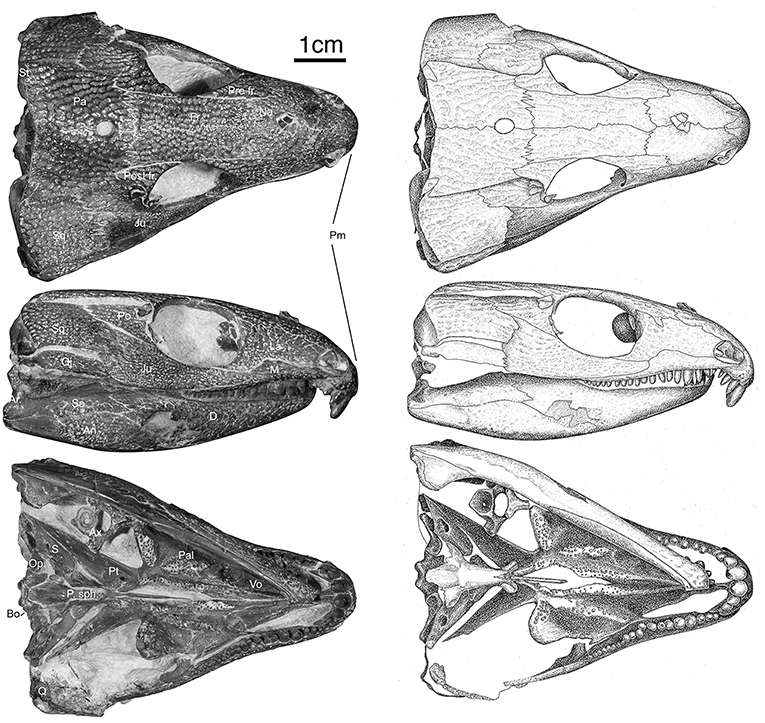
Skull of Captorhinus kierani

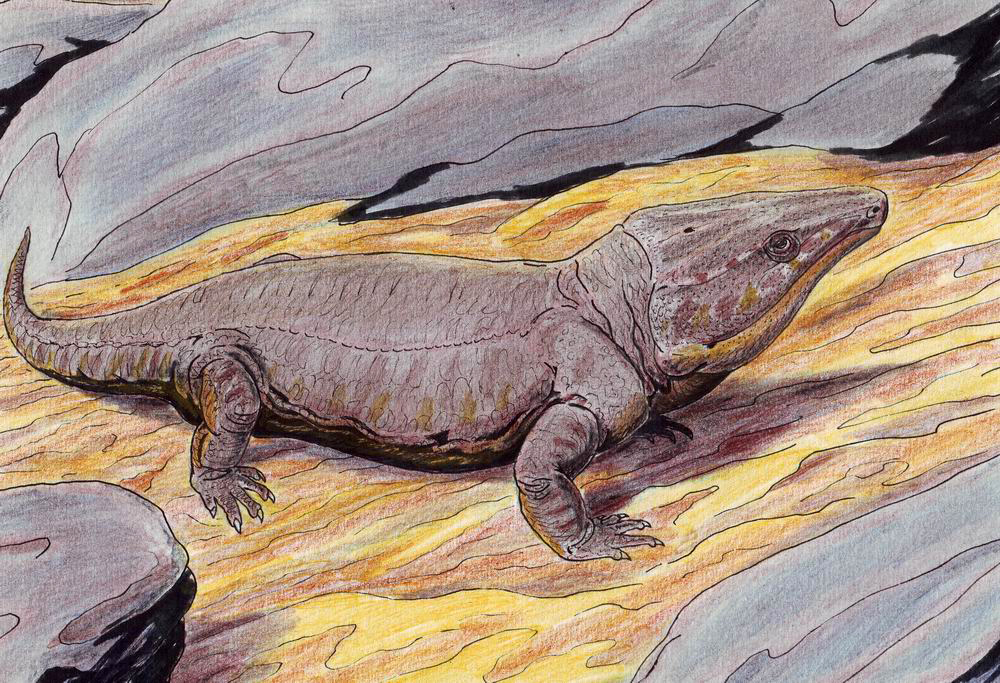
Life restoration of Labidosaurikos

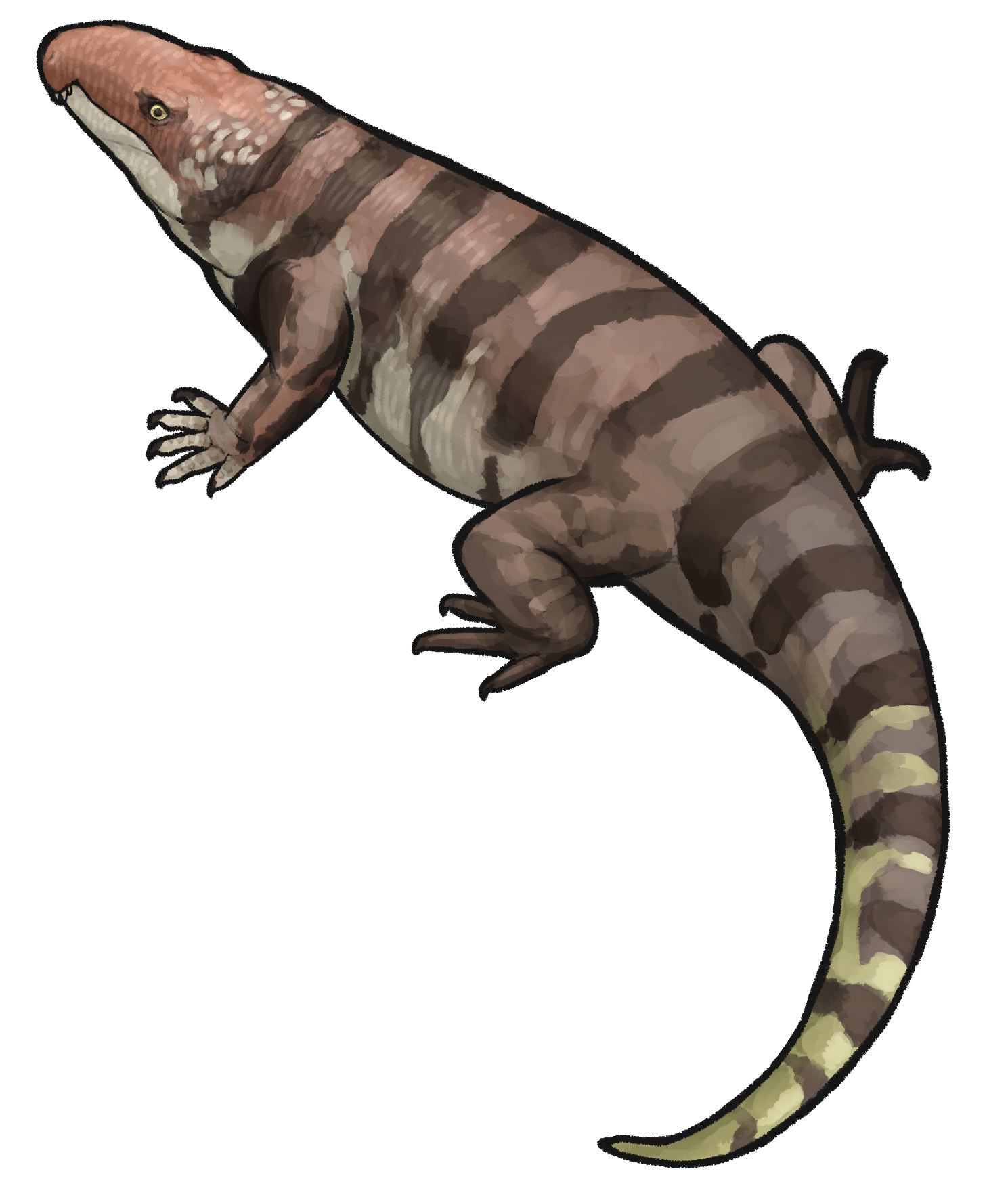
Life restoration of Sumidadectes

Histological and SEM analysis of captorhinid tail vertebrae concluded in a 2018 study that captorhinids were the first amniotes to develop caudal autotomy as a defensive function. In studied specimens a split line is present in certain caudal vertebrae that is similar to those found in modern reptiles that perform caudal autonomy. This behaviour represented significant evolutionary benefit for the animals, allowing for escape and distracting predators, as well as minimizing blood loss at an injury site.

Mummified specimens of Captorhinus indicate that captorhinids were covered in epidermal scales, similar to modern reptiles, and they had a cartilaginous sternum and cartilaginous extensions of the cervical ribs and trunk ribs, suggesting that they used the intercostal muscles to breathe similarly to modern lizards as opposed to the buccal breathing utilized by amphibians.

== Classification ==
=== Taxonomy ===
The following taxonomy follows Reisz et al., 2011 and Sumida et al., 2010 unless otherwise noted.

- Family Captorhinidae
  - Captorhinoides?
  - Acrodenta
  - Baeotherates
  - Captorhinus
  - Euconcordia
  - Labidosauriscus
  - Labidosaurus
  - Opisthodontosaurus
  - Protocaptorhinus
  - Reiszorhinus
  - Rhiodenticulatus
  - Romeria
  - Saurorictus
  - Subfamily Moradisaurinae
    - Amenoyengi
    - Balearosaurus
    - Captorhinikos
    - Gansurhinus
    - Gecatogomphius
    - Indosauriscus
    - Kahneria
    - Labidosaurikos
    - Moradisaurus
    - Rothianiscus
    - Sumidadectes
    - Tramuntanasaurus
- Dubious captorhinids
  - Puercosaurus
  - Riabininus
  - Chamasaurus

Euconcordia cunninghami is thought to be the basalmost known member of Captorhinidae. A phylogenetic study of primitive reptile relationships by Muller & Reisz in 2006 recovered Thuringothyris as a sister taxon of the Captorhinidae. The same results were obtained in later phylogenic analyses.

Captorhinidae contains a single named subfamily, the Moradisaurinae. Moradisaurinae was named and assigned to the family Captorhinidae by A. D. Ricqlès and P. Taquet in 1982. It has been defined as including all taxa more closely related to Moradisaurus grandis than to Labidosaurus hamatus. The moradisaurines inhabited what is now Africa, Europe, Asia, and North and South America.

Captorhinids were once thought to be the ancestors of turtles. The Middle Permian reptile Eunotosaurus from South Africa was seen as the "missing link" between cotylosaurs and chelonians throughout much of the early 20th century. However, more recent fossil finds have shown that Eunotosaurus is unrelated to captorhinids.

=== Phylogeny ===
The cladogram below is derived from the 2025 description of Amenoyengi mpunduensis by Jenkins et al., which represented the most comprehensive phylogeny of captorhinids at the time of its publication.

- - †Thuringothyris mahlendorffae
  - †Captorhinidae
    - Euconcordia cunninghami
    - - Opisthodontosaurus carrolli
      - - - Rhiodenticulatus heatoni
          - Rhodotheratus parvus
        - - Saurorictus australis
          - - Protocaptorhinus pricei
            - - Romeria prima
              - Romeria texana
          - - - Captorhinus laticeps
              - - Labidosauriscus richardi
                - - Captorhinus aguti
                  - - Captorhinus kierani
                    - Captorhinus magnus
            - - Reiszorhinus olsoni
              - - Labidosaurus hamatus
                - Moradisaurinae
                  - Sumidadectes chozaensis
                  - - Captorhinikos valensis
                    - - - Labidosaurikos meachami
                        - Rothianiscus sp.
                      - - - Kahneria seltina
                          - Tramuntanasaurus tiai
                        - - Moradisaurus grandis
                          - - Amenoyengi mpunduensis
                            - - Gansurhinus naobaogouensis
                              - Gansurhinus qingtoushanensis

The Captorhinidae have traditionally been placed within Eureptilia in the reptile total group (Sauropsida), as shown below, after the results of Muller and Reisz (2006):

- Reptilia/Sauropsida
  - †Parareptilia
  - Eureptilia
    - †Coelostegus
    - - - †Thuringothyris
        - †Captorhinidae
      - - †Brouffia
        - - †Paleothyris
          - - †Hylonomus
            - - - †Anthracodromeus
                - †Cephalerpeton
                - †Protorothyris
              - Diapsida

Simões et al. (2022) instead recovered captorhinids as stem-amniotes (outside of the clade including the reptile and mammal lineages), in a clade also containing Protorothyris archeri and Araeoscelidia. Using an updated version of this data matrix, Klembara et al. (2023) recovered comparable results. In contrast, Kelsey M. Jenkins et al. (2025) found a clade containing Captorhinidae and Araeoscelidia as the most basal branch of Sauropsida, supporting the traditional classification of captorhinids as a reptiles, though more basal than traditionally assumed.

Using a more comprehensive dataset incorporating new observations of many cranial regions based on synchrotron data, Xavier A. Jenkins et al. (2025) again found the captorhinids—an anapsid (no temporal fenestrae in the skull) clade—to be outside Amniota. They hypothesized that the common ancestor of amniotes would have had a synapsid (single-holed) skull, as is indicated in the skulls of the earliest known definitive members of the reptile (Sauropsida) and mammal (Synapsida) lines. The results of an updated version of this dataset published in 2026 are displayed below:^{supplementary figure S3}

- Tetrapoda
  - Temnospondyli
  - Reptiliomorpha (Pan‑Amniota)
    - - †Gephyrostegus
      - - †Lanthanosuchus
        - †Chroniosaurus
    - - †Seymouria
      - - - †Brouffia
          - †Coelostegus
        - - †Recumbirostra
          - - †Hylonomus
            - - - †Diadectomorpha
                - †Captorhinidae
              - - †Protorothyrididae
                - Amniota
                  - Synapsida
                  - Sauropsida
