= Klastomycter =

Klastomycter Temporal range: Early Permian (Artinskian), 289–286 Ma

Scientific classification
- Kingdom: Animalia
- Phylum: Chordata
- Class: Reptilia
- Clade: †Ankyramorpha
- Family: †Acleistorhinidae
- Genus: †Klastomycter; Reisz et al., 2024
- Species: †K. conodentatus

Binomial name
- †Klastomycter conodentatus Reisz et al., 2024

Extinct genus of stem-reptile

Klastomycter (lit. 'broken nostril') is an extinct genus of acleistorhinid 'parareptile' known from the Early Permian (Artinskian age) Richards Spur locality of Oklahoma, United States. The genus contains a single species, Klastomycter conodentatus, known from a partial skull. The skull bones have a distinct pitted texture, like other acleistorhinids, many of which it coexisted with. In contrast to some of these relatives, which had large teeth of many different sizes, those of Klastomycter were small and all similar in size.

== Discovery and naming ==
The Klastomycter fossil material was discovered at the Richards Spur locality of the Dolese Brothers Limestone Quarry in Comanche County, Oklahoma, United States. This fossil site consists of a complex system of vertical crevices that were filled in with sediment during the Early Permian, allowing organisms within to be preserved as fossils. The specimen is housed in the Burpee Museum of Natural History, where it is permanently accessioned as specimen BMRP2008.3.3. The specimen comprises much of an articulated skull, missing the mandible (lower jaw). To better observe this fossil and its internal anatomy, neutron tomography scans (a type of CT scan) were obtained using the Dingo instrument at the Australian Nuclear Science and Technology Organisation (ANSTO).

In 2026, Robert R. Reisz and colleagues described Klastomycter conodentatus as a new genus and species of acleistorhinid 'parareptile' based on these fossil remains, establishing BMRP2008.3.3 as the holotype specimen. The generic name, Klastomycter, combines the Greek words κλᾰστός (klăstós), meaning 'broken', and μυκτήρ (mŭktḗr), meaning 'nostril', in reference to the preservation of the disarticulated premaxilla (bone from the front of the snout) inside the skull. The specific name, conodentatus, is derived from the Greek word κῶνος (kônos), meaning 'conical', and the Latin word dentatus, meaning 'toothed', referencing the morphology of the species' dentition.

== Description ==
The holotype skull of K. conodentatus is 29.4 millimetres (1.16 in) long, with an orbit 9 mm (0.35 in) long. The lateral (facing the outside) surfaces of the skull roof bones are covered with small, shallow pits. The premaxilla (front tooth-bearing bone of the upper jaw) is narrow, with alveoli (sockets) for four teeth, though only three are preserved. The first two would have been similar in size, larger than all other teeth in the upper jaw, which decrease in size posteriorly (toward the rear). The maxilla (larger bone of the upper jaw) bears 19 tooth positions, most similar to Acleistorhinus (17 alveoli), compared to 24 in Delorhynchus cifellii and 13 in Colobomycter pholeter. The teeth are generally small and homodont (same morphology), similar to D. cifellii. In contrast, the teeth of Acleistorhinus and C. pholeter are larger and notably heterodont (variable morphology), with some enlarged caniniform teeth. All of the teeth of Klastomycter are conical, sharply-pointed, and slightly recurved, in contrast to all other acleistorhinids, which have at least some teeth with a more columnar form.

The jugal has a triradiate (three-pointed) morphology, implying Klastomycter bore a single temporal fenestra. Like the right premaxilla, the left quadratojugal is disarticulated from its natural position and displaced inside the skull. It bears a rugose texture on the lateral surface, without the pitting seen on other skull roof bones. It is similar in shape to the corresponding bone in Acleistorhinus. The right part of the palate is preserved in the K. conodentatus holotype, with the vomer, palatine, and pterygoid covered in multiple rows of small teeth (palatal dentition). The sphenethmoid bone is also preserved, and has a prominent Y-shape when seen from the front or back.

== Classification ==
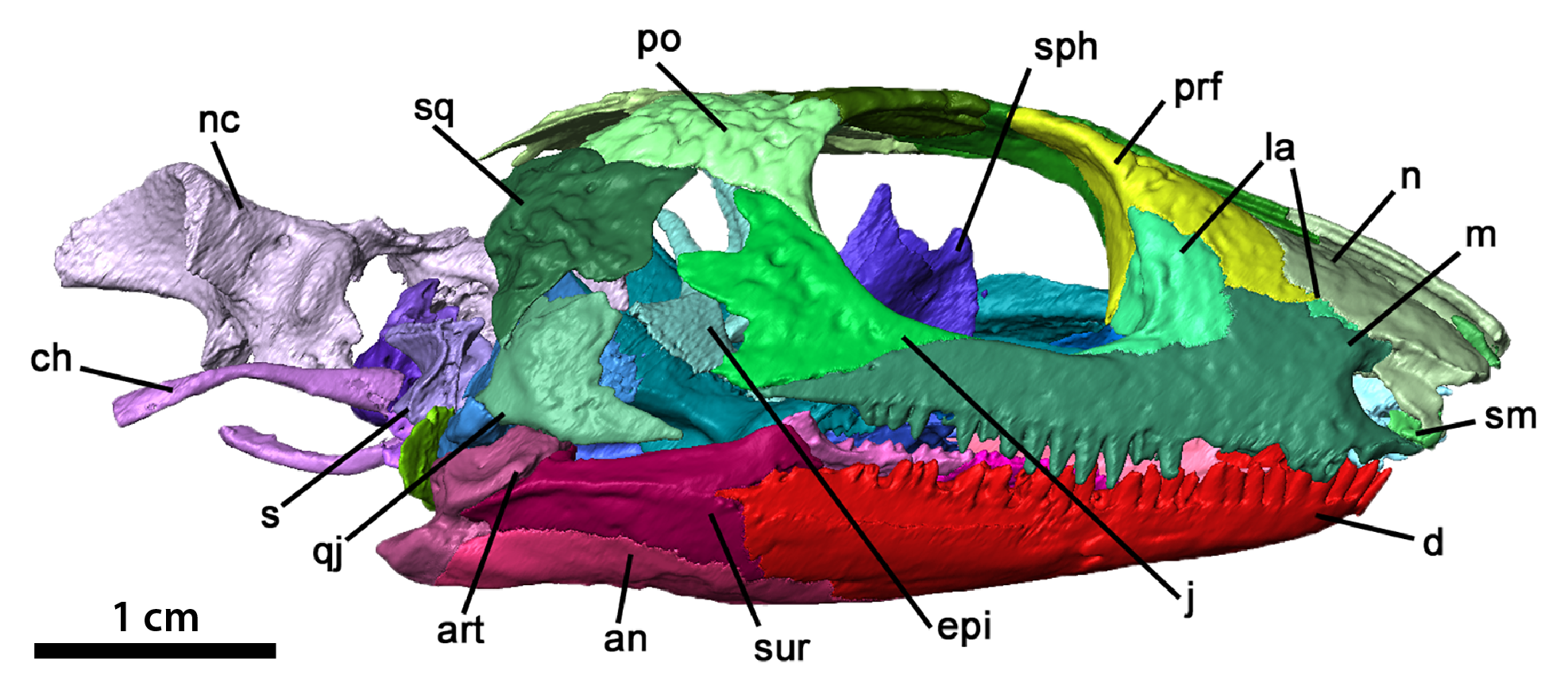
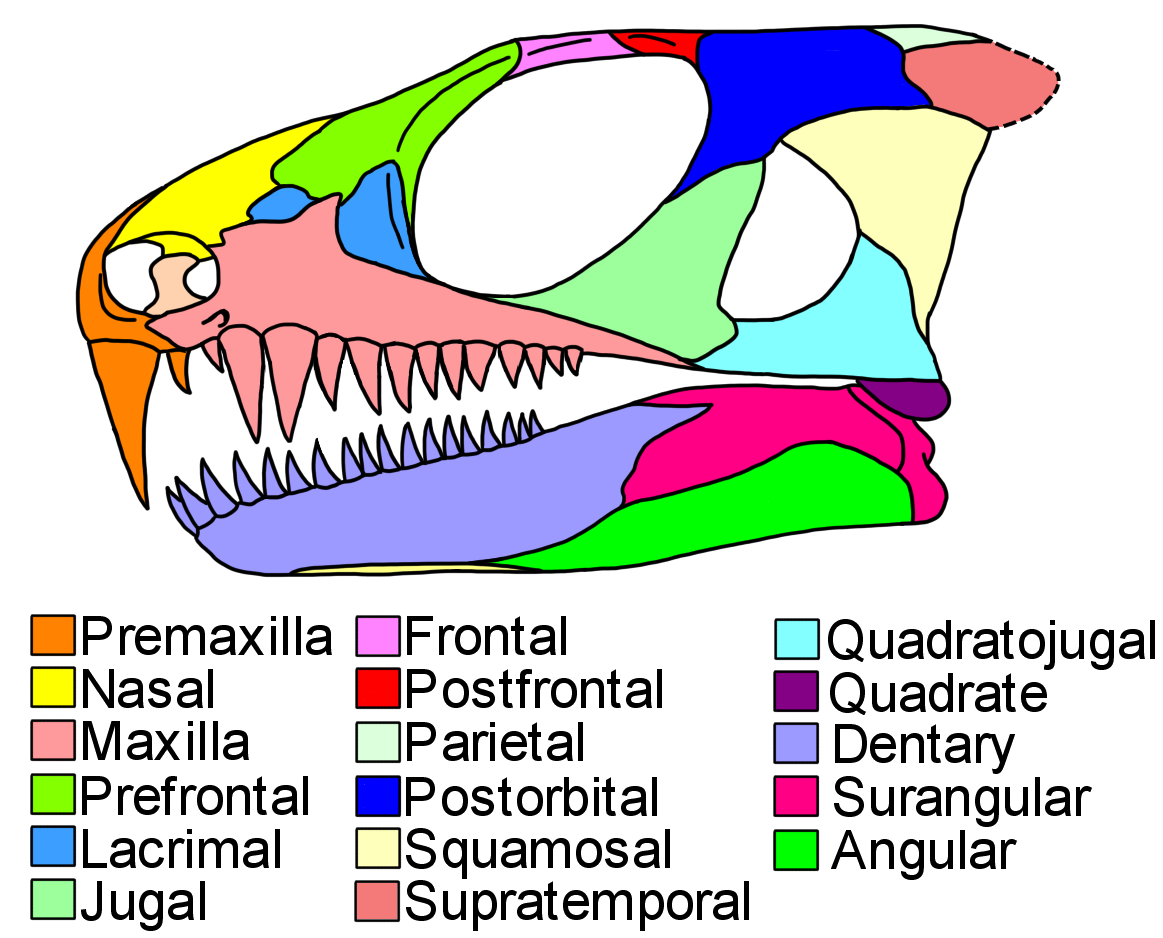
Skulls of Delorhynchus cifellii (top) and Colobomycter pholeter (bottom); note the highly distinct tooth morphologies.

To test the affinities and relationships of Klastomycter, Reisz and colleagues (2024) included it in a version of the phylogenetic matrix of Cisneros et al. (2021) updated by them the year prior. They recovered Klastomycter as the sister taxon to Delorhynchus cifellii, in turn sister to Colobomycter. Karutia, Acleistorhinus + Lanthanosuchus, and Feeserpeton were recovered as successive earlier branches. In previous work, this general assemblage of taxa has been referred to as the clade Lanthanosuchoidea. Alternatively, the family name Acleistorhinidae has been used for a selection of these taxa excluding Lanthanosuchus, which some researchers regard as a more distant relative. In turn, lanthanosuchoids / acleistorhinids have traditionally been placed within a large monophyletic stem-reptile group called Parareptilia, but later phylogenetic analyses have disputed these relationships, instead recovering 'parareptiles' as paraphyletic or polyphyletic collections of taxa. The relationships of lanthanosuchoids / acleistorhinids are displayed in the cladogram below, following the phylogenetic results of Reisz et al. (2024):

- - Feeserpeton oklahomensis
  - - - Acleistorhinus pteroticus
      - Lanthanosuchus watsoni
    - - Karutia fortunata
      - - - Colobomycter pholeter
          - Colobomycter vaughni
        - - Delorhynchus cifellii
          - Klastomycter conodentatus

== Paleoenvironment ==
Klastomycter is known from the Richards Spur locality, which dates to the Artinskian age of the early Permian period, around 289 to 286 million years ago. This fossiliferous site represents a unique depositional environment, where limestone dated to the much older Ordovician period was uplifted such that it became vertically oriented. Subsequent water infiltration resulted in dissolution along the outcrops' bedding planes, creating a cave system of fissures during the Early Permian. Permian vertebrates were likely not regular inhabitants of the caves, so the diverse fossil vertebrate fauna preserved therein would have been transported there by a combination of other means. One proposed interpretation is that animals died outside the caves, but their remains were transported in by flowing water from heavy precipitation during monsoonal episodes. This may explain the presence of disarticulated specimens in the Richards Spur fissures, as the animals could have decomposed before their remains were transported into the caves. Alternatively, the caves may have acted as natural pitfall traps, where living animals fell in unintentionally and died inside. This hypothesis would explain the presence of articulated skeletons in the Richards Spur deposits.

The Richards Spur locality is best known for the diversity of Early Permian vertebrate fossils preserved there, which includes amphibious temnospondyls, recumbirostrans, captorhinids, synapsids (mammal-line amniotes, including caseids, sphenacodontids, and varanopids), and sauropsids (reptile-line amniotes) like Klastomycter. Multiple other acleistorhinids are known from Richards Spur, including Colobomycter (C. pholeter and C. vaughni), Delorhynchus (D. cifellii, D. multidentatus, and D. priscus), and Feeserpeton. The unique tooth morphology in each species suggests niche partitioning would have existed among these close relatives. Other stem-reptiles include the 'parareptile' Microleter, the bolosaurid Bolosaurus grandis, the nyctiphruretid Abyssomedon, and the 'diapsids' Orovenator and Maiothisavros.
