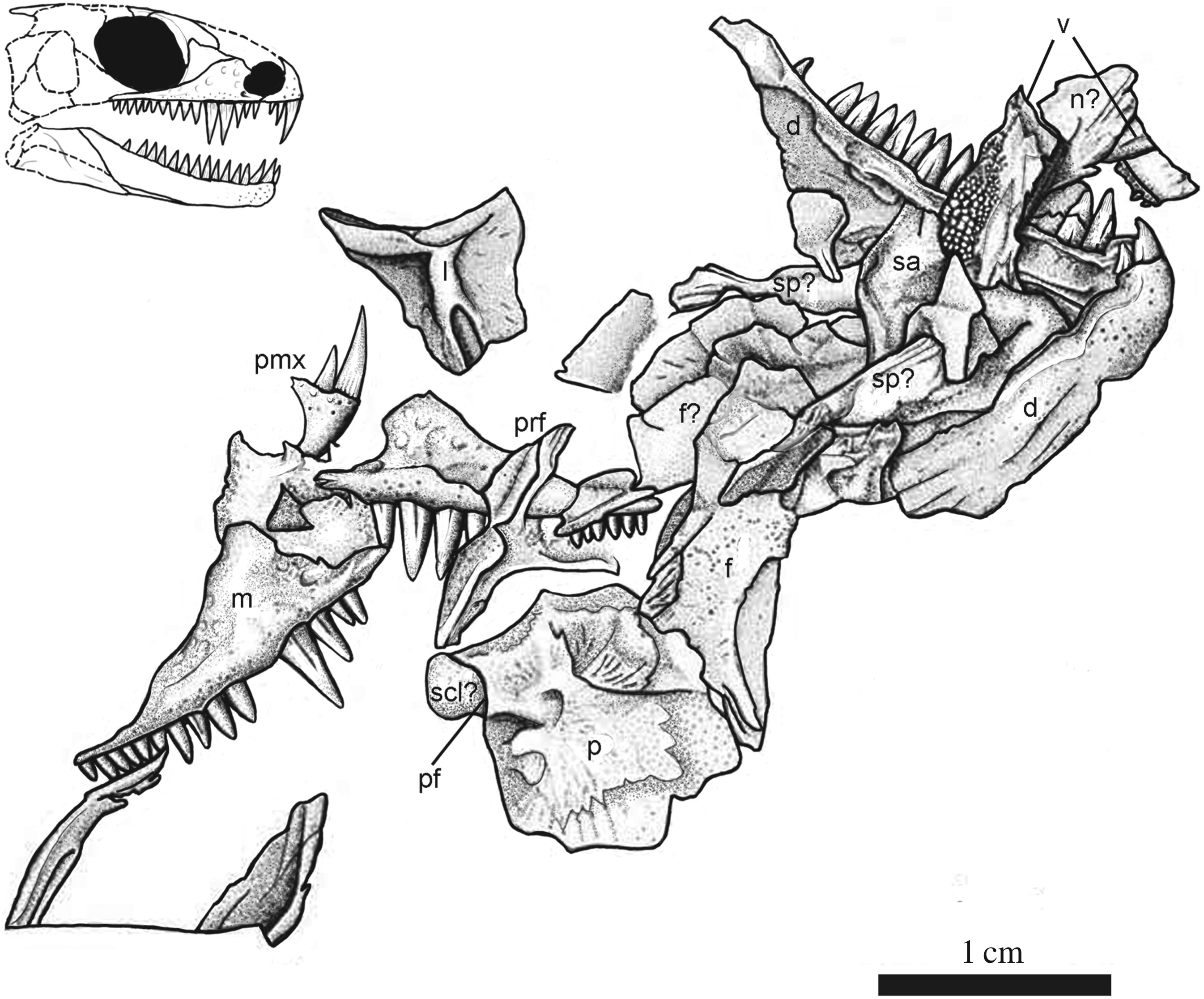
- Diagram and reconstruction of the holotype skull
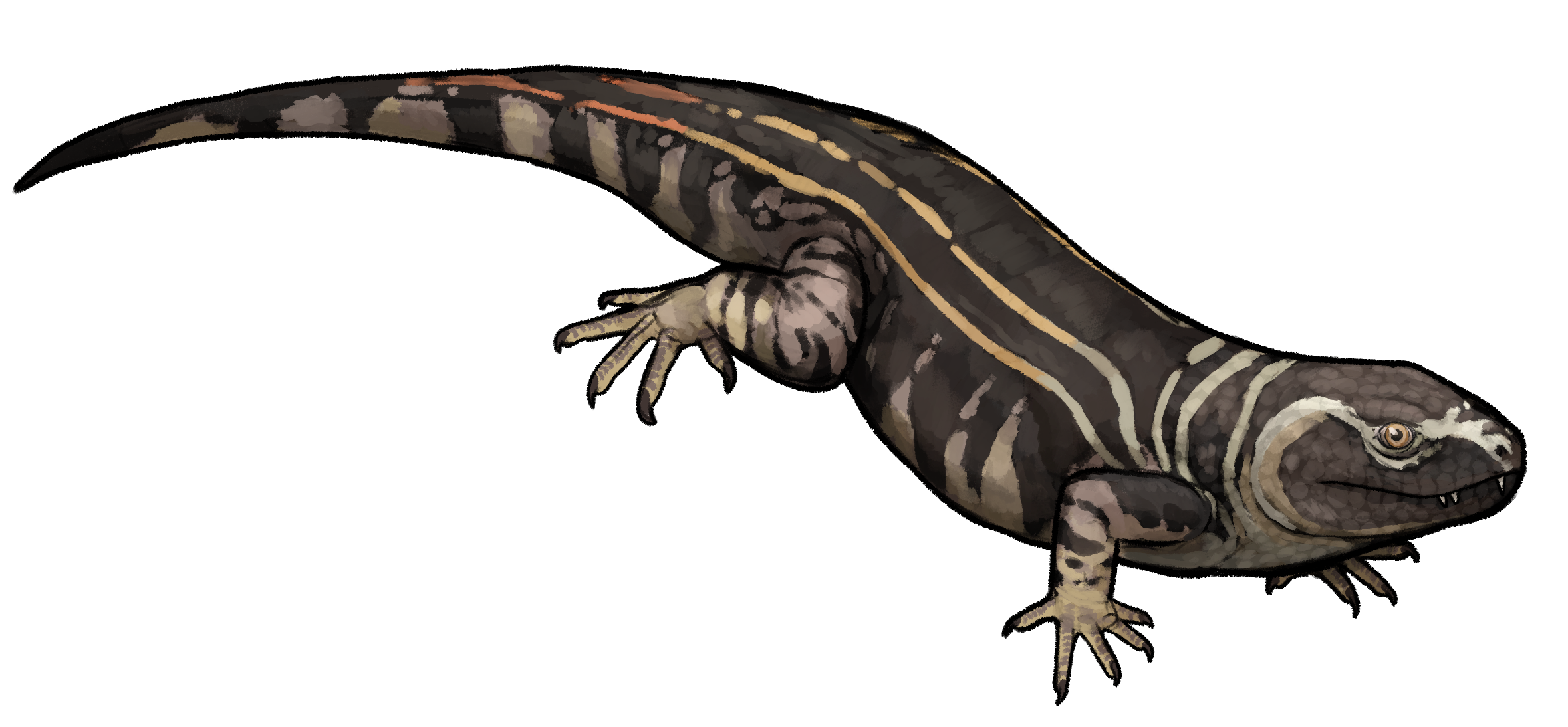
- Life restoration

Scientific classification
- Kingdom: Animalia
- Phylum: Chordata
- Class: Reptilia
- Family: †Acleistorhinidae
- Genus: †Carbonodraco; Mann et al., 2019

Type species
- †Carbonodraco lundi Mann et al., 2019

= Carbonodraco =

Carbonodraco Temporal range: Late Carboniferous (Pennsylvanian), Moscovian

Extinct genus of reptiles

Carbonodraco (lit. 'coal serpent') is an extinct genus of acleistorhinid 'parareptile' known from the Late Carboniferous of Ohio, United States. The genus contains a single species, Carbonodraco lundi, known from skull and jaw fragments. It is closely related to Colobomycter, a parareptile from the early Permian of Oklahoma, US. Carbonodraco is the oldest known 'parareptile', slightly older than Erpetonyx, the previous candidate for this title.

== Discovery and naming ==
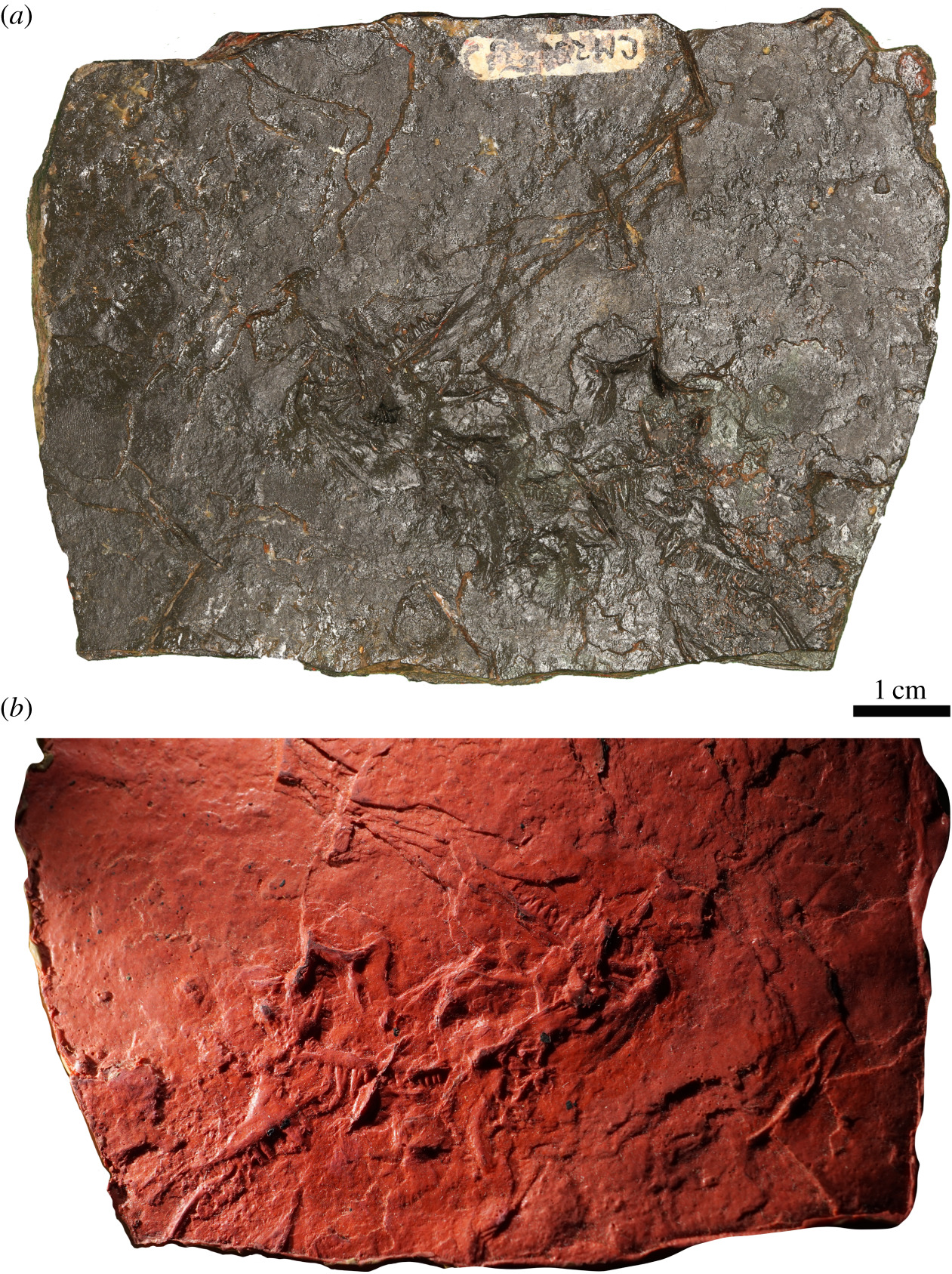
Holotype fossil slab (top) and latex cast (bottom)

The known remains of Carbonodraco were found at the Ohio Diamond Coal mine in Linton, Ohio. These include the holotype specimen (CM 23055, a crushed skull) and two referred specimens (NHMUK R. 2667, a right jaw; CM 81536, a pair of dentaries). Several of the Carbonodraco specimens were previously referred to the Carboniferous taxon Cephalerpeton by Reisz and Baird (1983). They were recognized as a distinct genus and species in a 2019 study by Arjan Mann and colleagues.

The generic name, Carbonodraco, combines the Latin words carbo, meaning 'coal', and draco, meaning 'serpent'. The specific name, lundi, honors Richard Lund, the discoverer of the holotype. Mann et al. (2019) identified this taxon as the oldest known 'parareptile', as it is known from the Moscovian age of the Middle Pennsylvanian. Erpetonyx, previously considered the oldest parareptile, is known from the more recent Gzhelian age of the Late Pennsylvanian.

== Classification ==
In their 2019 description of Carbonodraco, Mann et al. assigned this taxon to the family Acleistorhinidae based on anatomical observations of the known specimens, including the presence of caniniform teeth and pitted texture on the external cranial bones. They refrained from conducting a phylogenetic analysis, but noted particular similarities to Colobomycter and Acleistorhinus. In their description of the South American acleistorhinid Karutia two years later, Cisneros and colleagues conducted a phylogenetic analysis including both Karutia and Carbonodraco. These authors supported the conclusions of Mann et al. (2019), recovering Carbonodraco in an unresolved polytomy with both species of Colobomycter within the Acleistorhinidae. Carbonodraco and Colobomycter both share a notably enlarged tooth in the premaxilla. These results are displayed in the cladogram below:

- Acleistorhinidae
  - Acleistorhinus
  - Feeserpeton
  - - - Karutia
      - Delorhynchus
    - - Carbonodraco
      - Colobomycter pholeter
      - Colobomycter vaughni

In 2023, Rowe, Bevitt & Reisz expressed hesitation in accepting Carbonodraco as a 'parareptile' without any further explanation.
