= Karutia =

Karutia Temporal range: Early Permian, 278 Ma

Scientific classification
- Domain: Eukaryota
- Kingdom: Animalia
- Phylum: Chordata
- Clade: †Parareptilia
- Order: †Procolophonomorpha
- Family: †Acleistorhinidae
- Genus: †Karutia; Cisneros et al., 2021

Type species
- †Karutia fortunata Cisneros et al., 2021

Extinct genus of reptiles

Karutia is an extinct genus of parareptile known from the Early Permian Pedra de Fogo Formation of Brazil. The type species is Karutia fortunata.

The species name refers to the fact that the research team was lucky in finding the fossil while having changing a flat tyre.

== Discovery and naming ==
The fossil was discovered in 2016, being the third amnniote from the Pedra de Fogo Formation and the first acleistorhinid from Gondwana. The rock itself was found in a mudstone paving quarry, on the municipality of Nazária, Piauí. The name Karutia derives from the word kàruti of the local Timbira language, meaning 'skin covered by lumps or rugosities', in reference to the ornamentation on the cranial bones. The specific name, K. fortunata, comes from the Latin adjective fortunatus, meaning 'lucky', as it refers to the lucky discovery of the fossil while the research team fixed as flat tyre.

== Description ==
A majority of the bones, excluding some palatal elements and vertebrae, where found disarticulated. Furthermore, some elements could not be identified given their fragmentary nature. Based on more complete acleistorhinid material, the skull of Karutia was estimated to be 40 mm in length, and the whole skeleton to be 250 mm in length. The skull possesses cranial sculpturing, varying between bones, with rugosities, furrows, bosses of various sizes and tiny pits. Many of these pits are irregular and vary from the circular pits of Acleistorhinus, Colobomycter and Microleter.

== Paleoecology ==
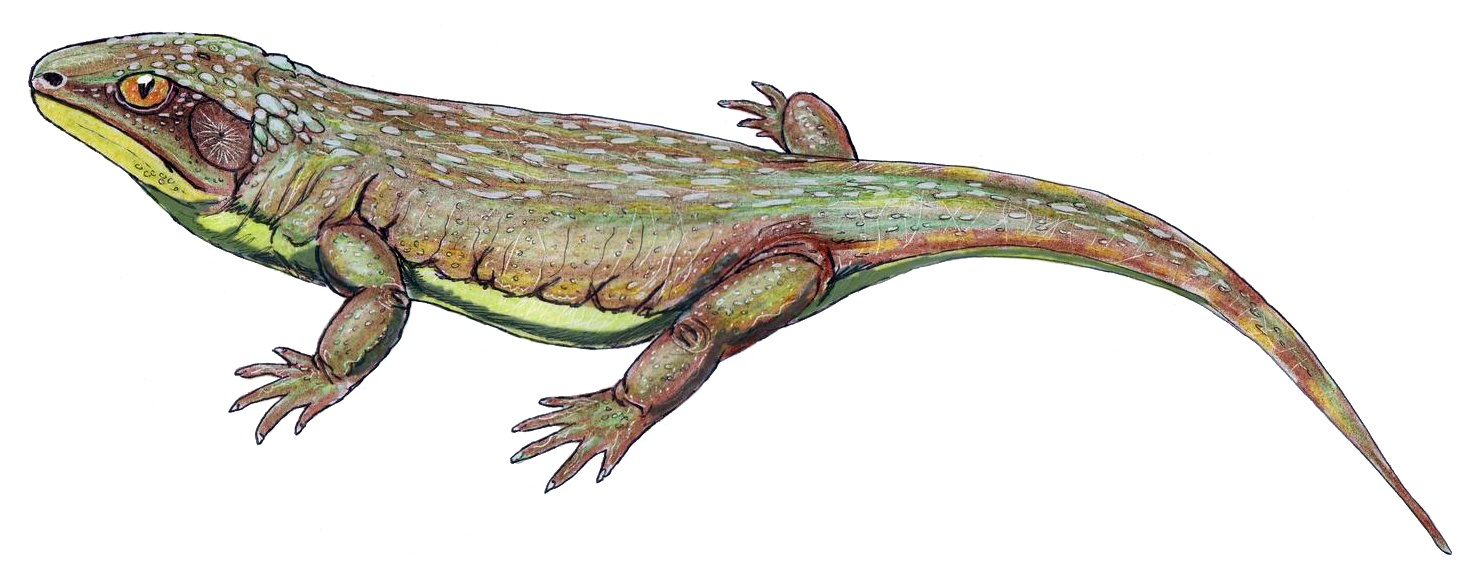
Emeroleter, a parareptile whose limbs were compared to Karutia as evidence of the latter also being a agile moving animal.

The limb bones of Karutia are long and gracile, unlike other parareptiles such as procolophonids, pareiasaurs or mesosaurs. They are, however, similar to Emeroleter, whose body proportions have been associated with the capability of fast moviment and increased sprint speed, based on comparisons with the modern Anolis lizard. Meanwhile, its dentition consists of sharp, conical and somewhat curved teeth, likly to be carnivorous. Combined, these traits are fit for acquiring small invertebrates as food sources and to escape tetrapod predators.

The paleoenvironment Karutia inhabited was the heavily vegetated lake or wetland system of the Pedra de Fogo Formation, dominated by bony fishes, like Brazilichthys, cartilagenous fishes, such as Sphenacanthus and Glikmanius, and temnospondyls, such as the massive Prionosuchus or Procuhy. Besides K. fortunata, the only other amniotes known from this formation were Captorhinikos and two other unidentified captorhinids.

== Phylogeny ==
In a phylogenetic analysis by Cisneros et al. (2021), K. fortunata falls under the family Acleistorhinidae and as a sister taxon to Delorhynchus.

- Acleistorhinidae
  - Acleistorhinus
  - Feeserpeton
  - - - Delorhynchus
      - Karutia fortunata
    - - Colobomycter pholeter
      - Colobomycter vaughni
      - Carbonodraco
