= Robert R. Reisz =

Canadian paleontologist

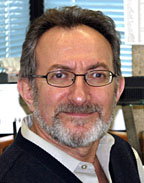
- Robert R. Reisz, 2004
- Born: Oradea, Romania
- Education: McGill University (PhD)
- Scientific career
- Fields: Paleontology
- Workplaces: University of Toronto Mississauga
- Doctoral advisor: Robert L. Carroll

Robert Rafael Reisz is a Canadian paleontologist and specialist in the study of early amniote and tetrapod evolution. He is a professor of biology at the University of Toronto Mississauga.

== Research career ==
Reisz received his B.Sc. (1969), M.Sc. (1971) and Ph.D. (1975) from McGill University as Robert L. Carroll's first doctoral graduate. After teaching as visiting lecturer at University of California, Los Angeles for a year, he accepted an appointment in the Biology Department at the University of Toronto's Mississauga Campus in 1975 where he still maintains his research lab. His research has been funded continuously by the Natural Sciences and Engineering Research Council of Canada (NSERC). He conducted field work in North America, Africa, and Europe, where he excavated fossils from the late Paleozoic and early Mesozoic eras. These excavations were frequently funded by the National Geographic Society.

Reisz has broad interests in vertebrate paleontology. He has published more than 100 scientific articles on subjects as diverse as lungfish and dinosaurs, but is best known for his work on early amniotes. His research includes discovering the oldest known dinosaur embryos, the oldest known bipedal reptile, and the oldest known diapsid reptile.

Reisz is a research associate at the Royal Ontario Museum, Toronto (since 1975), the Carnegie Museum of Natural History, Pittsburgh (since 1980), and the Field Museum of Natural History, Chicago (since 1998). He was a Senior Visiting Scientist at the Paleontological Institute of the Russian Academy of Science, Moscow (1989–2003) and Invited Professor at the Muséum national d'Histoire naturelle, Paris (2000–2003). Among others he received the Bass Fellowship of the Field Museum of Natural History (1998–2000), the Visiting Wilson Fellowship of the University of London, King's College (2000–2001), and a Research Award from the Alexander von Humboldt Foundation (2006–2008). In 2007, Reisz was honoured by the American Association for the Advancement of Science (AAAS) and was recognized as a Fellow. He was Senior Editor (2006-2010) of the Journal of Vertebrate Paleontology, published by the Society of Vertebrate Paleontology. A special issue of the Comptes Rendus Palevol of the French Academy of Sciences that was devoted to him.

Below is a list of taxa that Reisz has contributed to naming:

Year	Taxon	Authors
2025	Akkedops bremneri gen. et sp. nov.	Mooney, Scott, & Reisz
2024	Klastomycter conodentatus gen. et sp. nov.	Reisz, Rowe, & Bevitt
2022	Maiothisavros dianeae gen. et sp. nov.	Mooney, Maho, Bevitt, & Reisz
2021	Delorhynchus multidentatus sp. nov.	Rowe, Scott, Bevitt, & Reisz
2020	Martensius bromackerensis gen. et sp. nov.	Berman, Maddin, Henrici, Sumida, Scott, & Reisz
2019	Captorhinus kierani sp. nov.	DeBraga, Bevitt, & Reisz
2018	Labidosauriscus richardi gen. et sp. nov.	Modesto, Scott, & Reisz
2016	Colobomycter vaughni sp. nov.	MacDougall, Modesto, & Reisz
2015	Erpetonyx arsenaultorum gen. et sp. nov.	Modesto, Scott, MacDougall, Sues, Evans, & Reisz
2014	Abyssomedon williamsi gen. et sp. nov.	MacDougall & Reisz
2012	Feeserpeton oklahomensis gen. et sp. nov.	MacDougall & Reisz
2011	Sarahsaurus aurifontanalis gen. et sp. nov.	Rowe, Sues, & Reisz
2010	Microleter mckinzieorum gen. et sp. nov.	Tsuji, Müller, & Reisz
2009	Australothyris smithi gen. et sp. nov.	Modesto, Scott, & Reisz
2008	Gerobatrachus hottoni gen. et sp. nov.	Anderson, Reisz, Scott, Fröbisch, & Sumida
2005	Oromycter dolesorum gen. et sp. nov.	Reisz
2004	Ambedus pusillus gen. et sp. nov.	Kissel & Reisz
2003	Archaeovenator hamiltonensis gen. et sp. nov.	Reisz & Dilkes
2002	Bolosaurus grandis sp. nov.	Reisz, Barkas, & Scott
2001	Dimetrodon teutonis sp. nov.	Berman, Reisz, Martens, & Henrici
2000	Eudibamus cursoris gen. et sp. nov.	Berman, Reisz, Scott, Henrici, Sumida, & Martens
1992	Dolabrosaurus aquatilis gen. et sp. nov.	Berman & Reisz
1987	Anconastes vesperus gen. et sp. nov.	Berman, Reisz, & Eberth
1986	Rhiodenticulatus heatoni gen. et sp. nov.	Berman & Reisz

== Selected publications ==
- Reisz, R. R., Scott, D., Sues, H.-D., Evans, D. C. and Raath, M. A. (2005) Embryos of an Early Jurassic prosauropod dinosaur and their evolutionary significance. Science 309: 761-764.
- Reisz, R. R. and Smith, M.M. (2001) Lungfish dental pattern conserved for 360 million years. Nature 411: 548-550.
- Rybczynski, N and Reisz, R.R. (2001) Earliest evidence for efficient oral processing in a terrestrial herbivore. Nature 411: 684-687.
- Reisz, R.R., and Sues, H-D. (2000) The 'feathers' of Longisquama. Nature 408: 428.
- Berman, D. S, Reisz, R.R., Henrici, A.C., Sumida, S.S. and Martens, T. (2000) Early Permian Bipedal Reptile. Science 290: 969-972.
- Reisz, R.R. and H.D. Sues. (2000). Herbivory in Late Paleozoic and Triassic Terrestrial Vertebrates. pp 9–41. in: Evolution of Herbivory in Terrestrial Vertebrates, Cambridge Univ. Press., H.D. Sues, ed.
- Sues, H.D. and R.R. Reisz. (1998). Origins and early evolution of herbivory in tetrapods. TREE vol. 13.4, pp. 141–145.
- Reisz, R.R. (1997). The origin and early evolutionary history of amniotes. TREE. vol. 2 (6): 218-222.
- Laurin, M. and Reisz, R.R. (1995) A reevaluation of early amniote phylogeny. Zool. Jour. Linn. Soc. 113: 165-223.
- Laurin, M. and R. R. Reisz. (1997). A new perspective on tetrapod phylogeny. pp. 8–58. in: "The Origin of Amniotes: Completing the Transition to Land", Sumida, S. S.and K. L. M. Martin
- Reisz, R.R. and Laurin, M. (1991). Owenetta and the origin of turtles. Nature 349(6307): 324-326.
- Laurin, M. and R.R. Reisz. (1990). Tetraceratops is the oldest known therapsid. Nature: 345(6272): 249-250.
- Reisz, R.R. (1986). Pelycosauria. Handbuch der Palaeoherpetologie. Gustav Fischer Verlag, Stuttgart (P. Wellenhofer ed.) 102 pp., 43 figs.
- Reisz, R.R. (1977). Petrolacosaurus, the oldest known diapsid reptile. Science 196: 1091-1093.
