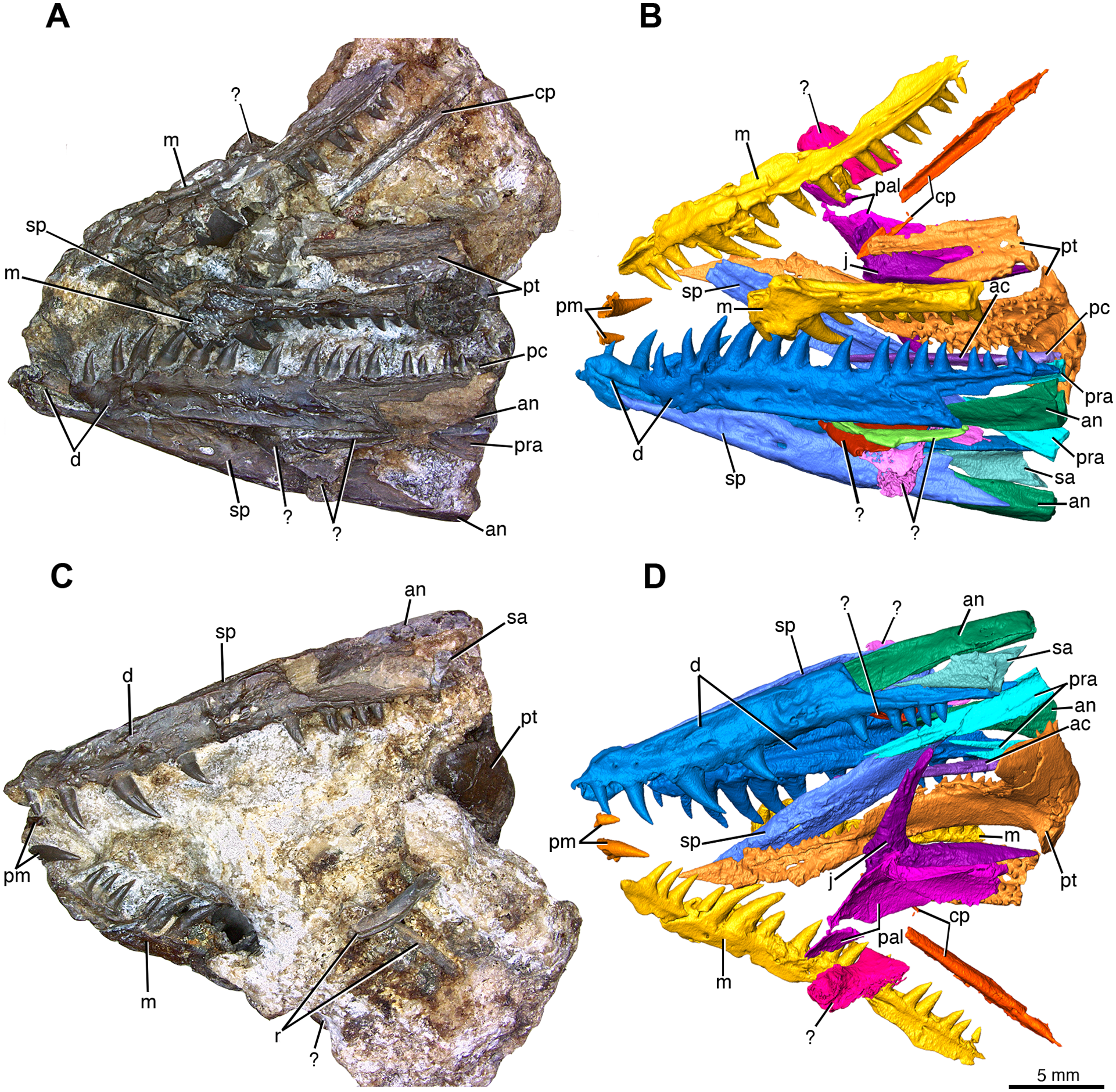
- Holotype in left (A, B) and right (C, D) views

Scientific classification
- Kingdom: Animalia
- Phylum: Chordata
- Class: Reptilia
- Clade: Diapsida
- Clade: incertae sedis
- Genus: †Maiothisavros; Mooney et al., 2022
- Species: †M. dianeae

Binomial name
- †Maiothisavros dianeae Mooney et al., 2022

= Maiothisavros =

Maiothisavros Temporal range: Early Permian (Artinskian), 289–286 Ma

Extinct genus of stem-reptile

Maiothisavros is an extinct genus of early diapsid stem-reptile known from the Early Permian (Artinskian age) Richards Spur locality of Oklahoma, United States. The genus contains a single species, Maiothisavros dianeae, known from a partial skull and several fragmentary mandibles. It is characterized by its very large, back-curved, conical teeth and sturdy lower jaw with an expanded symphysis. Both of these features indicate predatory behavior. The skull was likely slender and gracile in its overall morphology.

== Discovery and naming ==
The Maiothisavros fossil material was discovered at the Richards Spur locality of the Dolese Brothers Limestone Quarry in Comanche County, Oklahoma, United States. This fossil site consists of a complex system of vertical crevices that were filled in with sediment during the Early Permian, allowing organisms within to be preserved as fossils. The Maiothisavros specimens are housed in the Royal Ontario Museum, and include a partial skull and mandible (accessioned as specimen ROMVP 87366), three partial right dentaries (ROMVP 87367, 87368, and 87369), and a partial left dentary (ROMVP 87370). To better observe the most complete specimen, ROMVP 87366, and its internal anatomy, neutron tomography scans (a type of CT scan) were obtained using the Dingo instrument at the Australian Nuclear Science and Technology Organisation (ANSTO). Histological sections were created from ROMVP 87370.

In 2026, Ethan D. Mooney and colleagues described Maiothisavros dianeae as a new genus and species of neodiapsid reptile based on these fossil remains, establishing ROMVP 87366 as the holotype specimen. The generic name, Maiothisavros, combines the Greek words Μάιος (Máios), meaning 'May', and θησαυρός (thisavrós), meaning 'treasure', honoring Bill May, a contributor to the Richards Spur fossil collection who, along with Julie May, collected the fossils of this taxon. The specific name, dianeae, honors scientific illustrator, fossil preparator, and paleontology researcher Diane Scott and her contributions to the field.

== Description and classification ==
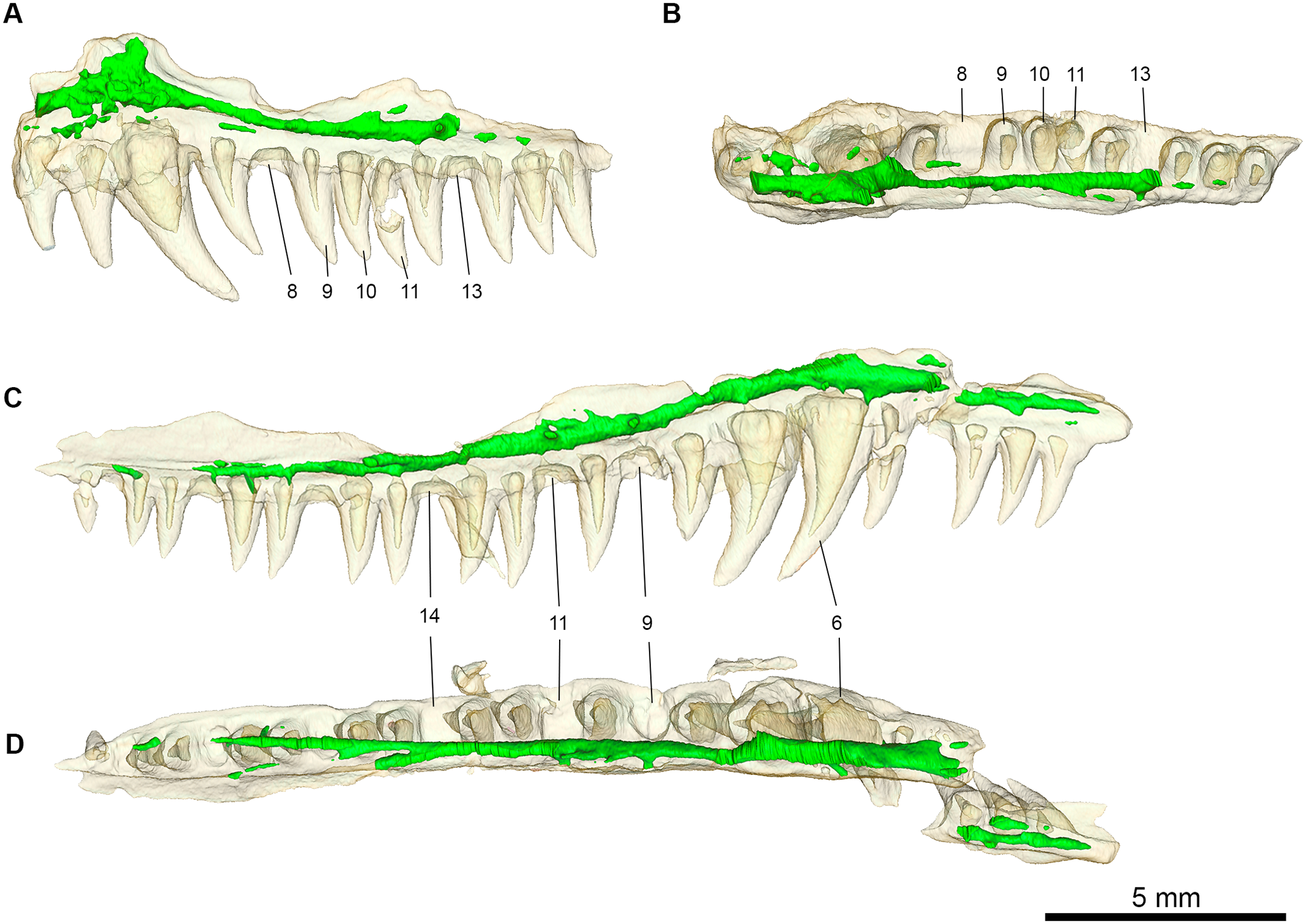
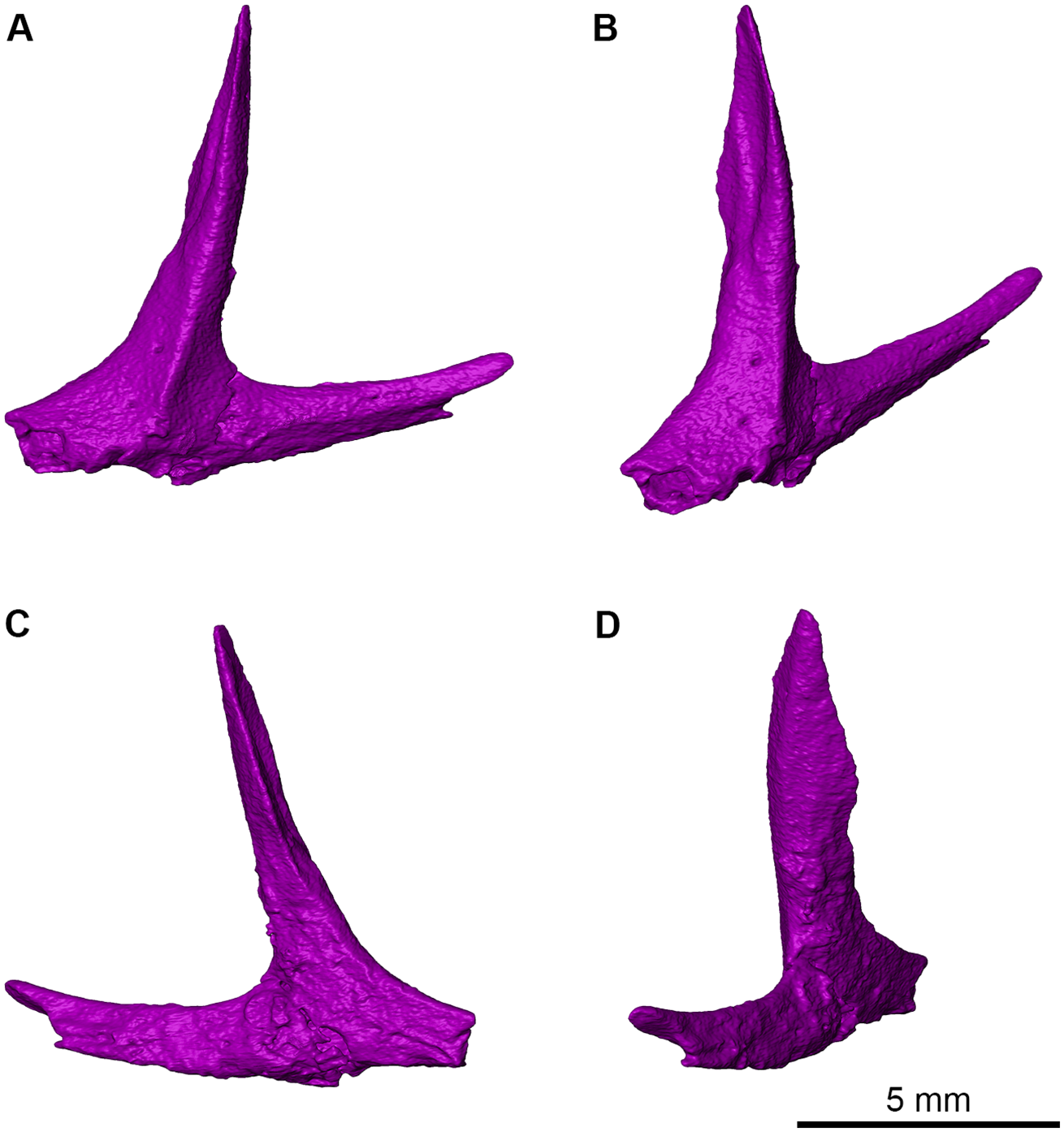
Maxilla (left) and jugal (right) of the M. dianeae holotype

The M. dianeae holotype is fragmentary and poorly articulated, comprising the anterior (front) part of the skull and mandible, in addition to parts of the palate. Two fragmentary ribs and several indeterminate bone fragments are also preserved but are not particularly informative. The skull likely measured 6 centimetres (2.4 in) when complete. Its observable anatomy indicates a generally gracile and slender morphology. The premaxilla (front tooth-bearing bone of the upper jaw) is not preserved, but two of its teeth are, which are conical and recurved, coming to a sharp point. The maxilla (larger bone of the upper jaw) is long and narrow, bearing at least 24 alveoli (sockets). The posterior (rear) part of the bone is missing, so more teeth may have been present in life. Like the teeth of the premaxilla, those of the maxilla are conical and recurved, with wide bases and prominent carinae (cutting edges). The sixth and seventh maxillary teeth have a caniniform morphology and have especially prominent carinae. The maxillary canal inside the bone is mostly tubular with few lateral projections. This is characteristic of diapsids, and contrasts with the extensively branched and non-tubular morphology of the maxillary canal in synapsids like Heleosaurus and Varanosaurus.

The jugal is triradiate (three-pointed) in morphology, similar to other sauropsids like Youngina with a diapsid skull architecture. Its gracile form indicates it is more derived than araeoscelidians. It is more robust than the coeval sauropsid Orovenator, and lacks the rugosity on the external surface seen in some varanopids like the coeval Mesenosaurus.

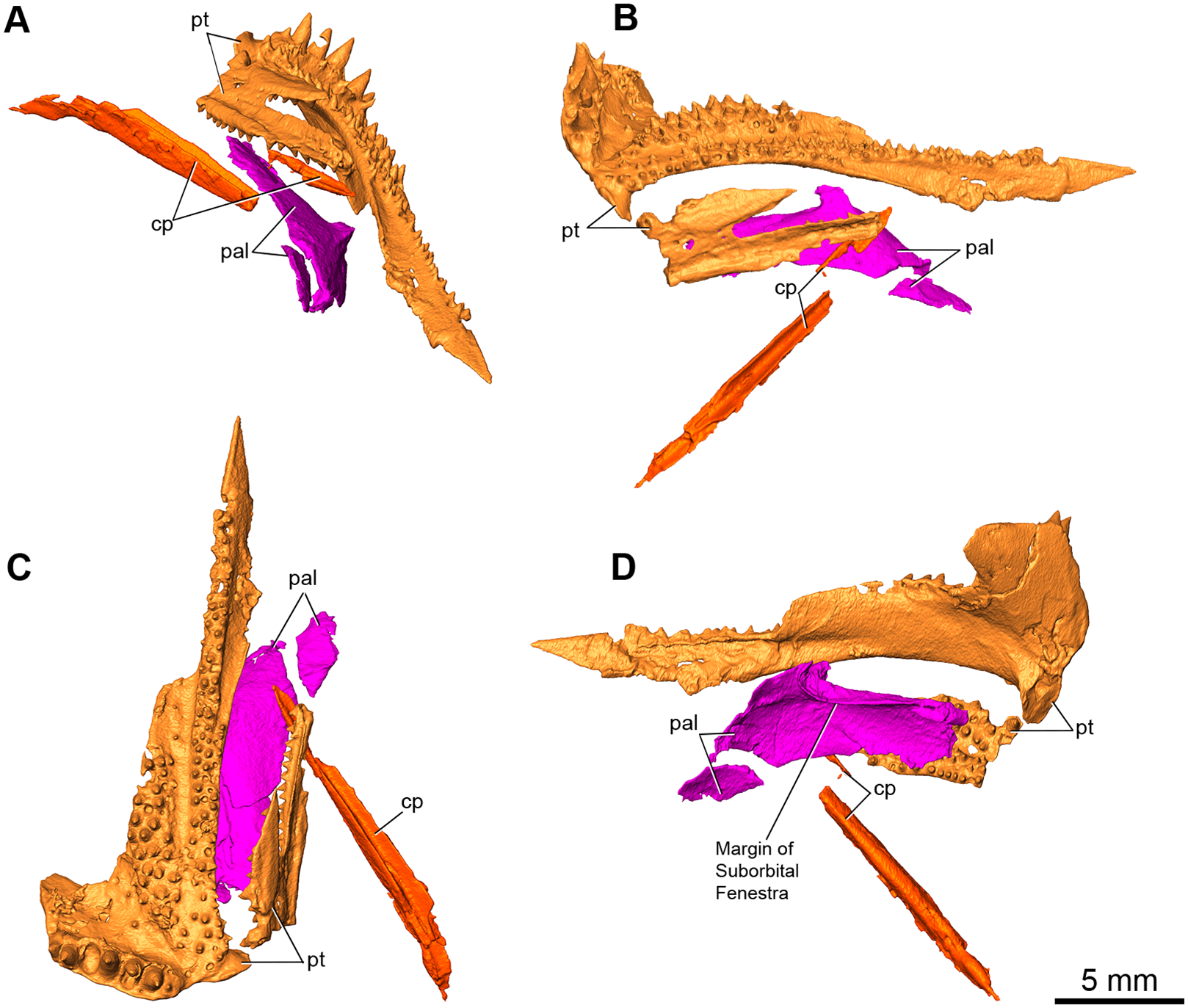
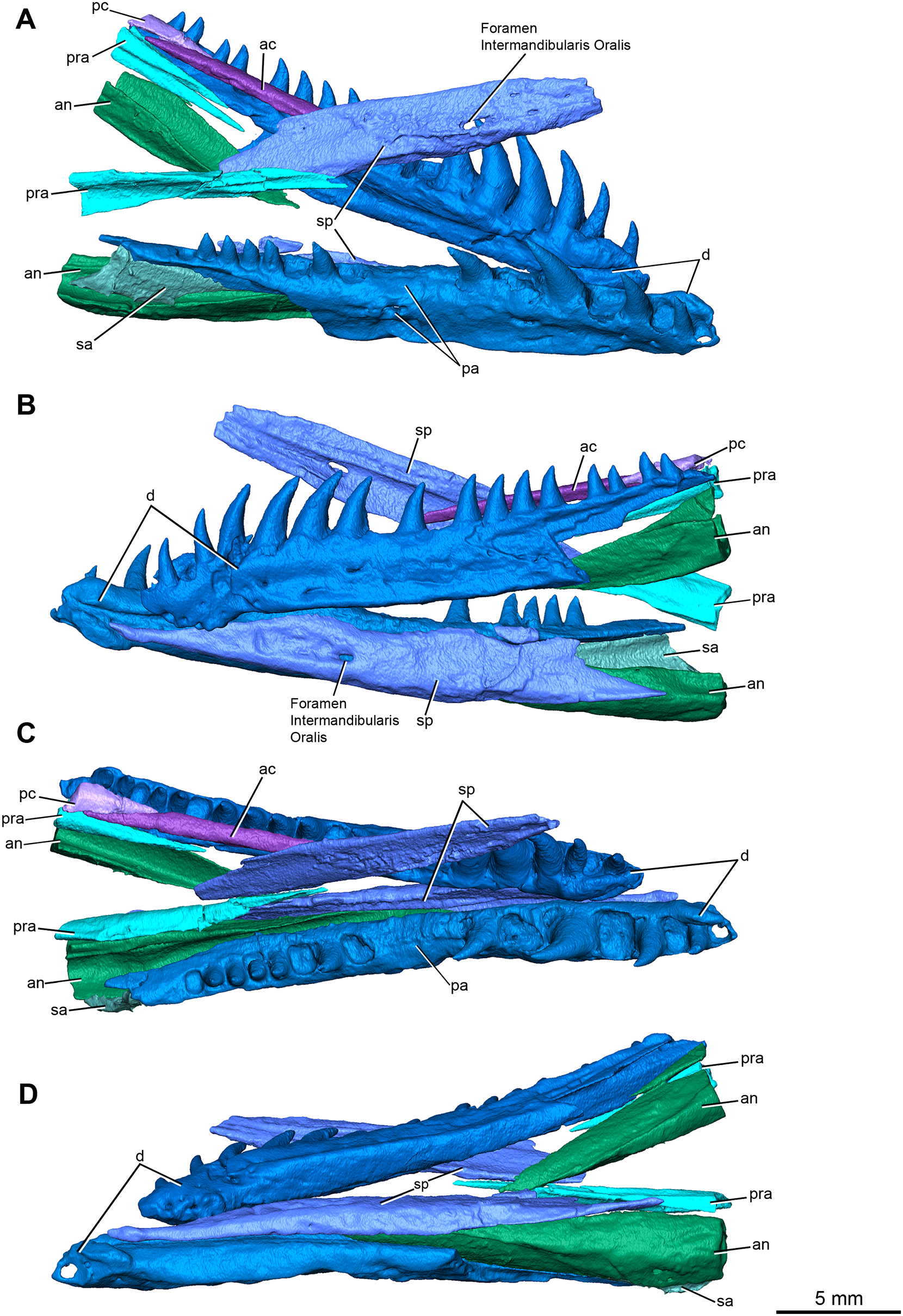
Palatal (left) and mandibular (right) elements of the M. dianeae holotype

The pterygoid, the largest bone of the palate, is preserved and preserves at least two tooth field rows. There is a single row of palatal teeth on the transverse flange of the pterygoid. These teeth are recurved and unusually large, comparable in size to those of the maxilla and dentary (tooth-bearing bone of the mandible). The preserved part of the palatine bone does not exhibit teeth. The dentary has a notably expanded symphysis, with many small foramina scattered along the front and bottom of the bone. 21 teeth would have been present in the dentary, with the first three being the smallest. The fifth through eighth teeth are the largest, with the remaining teeth decreasing in size posteriorly. Like the teeth in the maxilla, those of the dentary are conical and recurved. The splenials on the medial (inner surface) of the mandible are long, reinforcing the symphysis anteriorly. Two coronoid bones appear to be present on each side of the mandible. Mooney and colleagues estimated that the tooth replacement rate of Maiothisavros was around 192 days. This is somewhat unexpected, given the delicate form of the teeth. The coeval Orovenator can further be distinguished from Maiothisavros by its dental and mandibular anatomy. In comparison to Maiothisavros, its teeth are notably smaller and more numerous, with less curvature. The teeth are more consistent in size throughout the jaw, contrasting with the caniniform teeth of Maiothisavros.The lower jaw of Orovenator is slender, consistently tapering toward the front, contrasting with the more robust jaw and expanded symphysis of Maiothisavros.

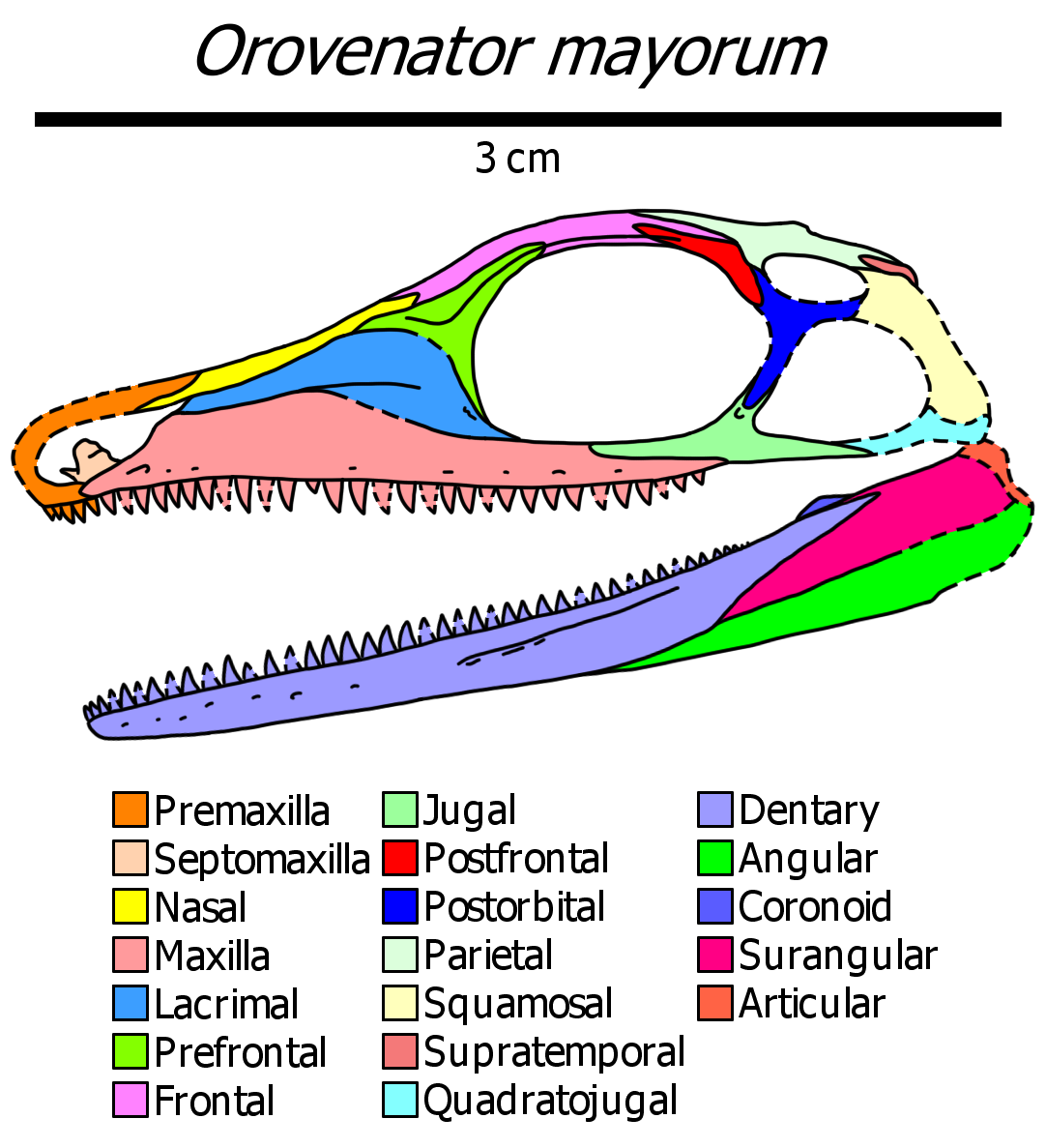
Reconstructed skull of the coeval Orovenator; note the small teeth and tapered mandible compared to Maiothisavros.

Combined observations of the maxilla and palatine, both of which are incomplete, suggest Maiothisavros had a large suborbital fenestra. This feature is a synapomorphy (shared characteristic) of diapsid reptiles. Based on their anatomical observations, Mooney et al. (2022) concluded that Maiothisavros likely represents a highly derived member of the Neodiapsida, but they did not conduct a phylogenetic analysis to further support this assessment. They also regarded the coeval Orovenator as a neodiapsid, but other researchers have regarded it as a more basal non-neodiapsid taxon. In 2025, Jenkins and colleagues regarded Maiothisavros as a 'diapsid' with uncertain affinities.

== Paleobiology ==
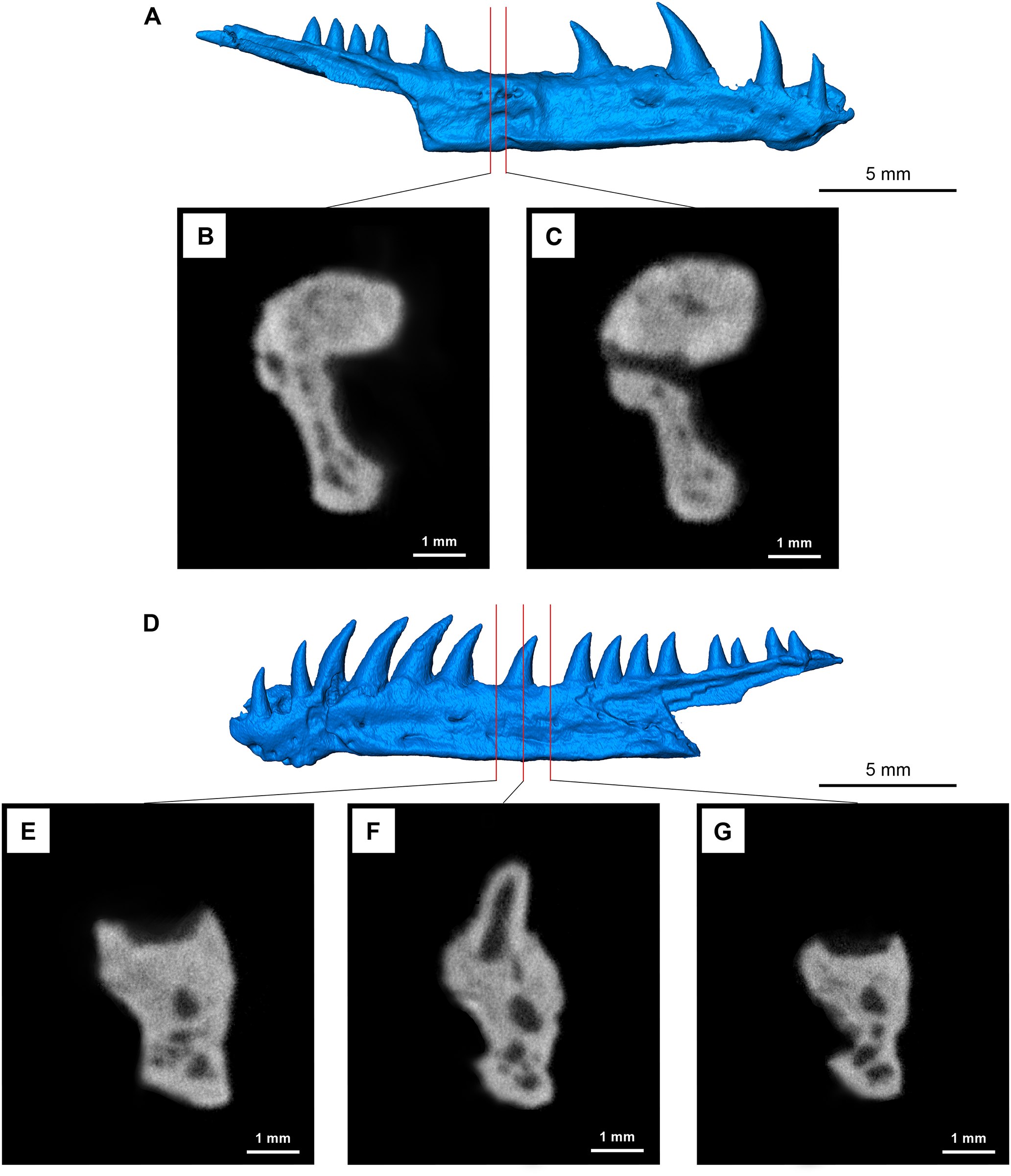
Pathologic right dentary (A) compared to the normal left dentary (D)

The recurved, conical marginal teeth and extensively denticulate pterygoid of Maiothisavros suggest it was adapted to a predatory lifestyle involving holding prey items. The lack of serrations on the teeth implies effective prey-piercing. The reinforcement of the mandible from the dentary symphysis and expanded splenial would have improved its structural integrity and likely increased its bite force. Invertebrates with hard exoskeletons may have made up part of the animal's diet; in coeval acleistorhinid sauropsids with recurved teeth, arthropod cuticles have been found between the palatal teeth in some specimens. Maiothisavros may have also consumed small vertebrates, many of which have been found as fossils in the Richards Spur site.

The right dentary of the holotype preserves a significant pathology between teeth 8–10, with excess bone tissue covering the three sockets. The lateral bone surface in this region is rugose.

== Paleoenvironment ==
Maiothisavros is known from the Richards Spur locality, which dates to the Artinskian age of the early Permian period, around 289 to 286 million years ago. This fossiliferous site represents a unique depositional environment, where limestone dated to the much older Ordovician period was uplifted such that it became vertically oriented. Subsequent water infiltration resulted in dissolution along the outcrops' bedding planes, creating a cave system of fissures during the Early Permian. Permian vertebrates were likely not regular inhabitants of the caves, so the diverse fossil vertebrate fauna preserved therein would have been transported there by a combination of other means. One proposed interpretation is that animals died outside the caves, but their remains were transported in by flowing water from heavy precipitation during monsoonal episodes. This may explain the presence of disarticulated specimens in the Richards Spur fissures, as the animals could have decomposed before their remains were transported into the caves. Alternatively, the caves may have acted as natural pitfall traps, where living animals fell in unintentionally and died inside. This hypothesis would explain the presence of articulated skeletons in the Richards Spur deposits.

The Richards Spur locality is best known for the diversity of Early Permian vertebrate fossils preserved there, which includes amphibious temnospondyls, recumbirostrans, captorhinids, synapsids (mammal-line amniotes, including caseids, sphenacodontids, and varanopids), and sauropsids (reptile-line amniotes) like Maiothisavros and Orovenator. Other stem-reptiles include the 'parareptile' Microleter, the bolosaurid Bolosaurus grandis, the nyctiphruretid Abyssomedon, and the acleistorhinids Colobomycter, Delorhynchus, Klastomycter, and Feeserpeton.
