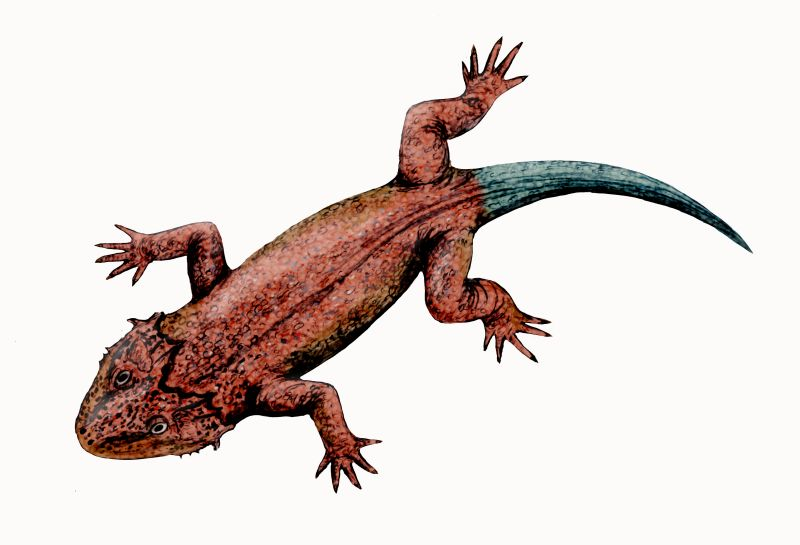
- Restoration of Lanthanosuchus watsoni

Scientific classification
- Kingdom: Animalia
- Phylum: Chordata
- Class: Reptilia
- Clade: †Ankyramorpha
- Superfamily: †Lanthanosuchoidea; Ivachnenko, 1980

Subgroups
- †Lanthaniscus; †Acleistorhinidae?; †Lanthanosuchidae

= Lanthanosuchoidea =

Lanthanosuchoids Temporal range: Late Carboniferous - Late Permian, 306–255 Ma

Extinct superfamily of reptiles

Lanthanosuchoidea is an extinct superfamily of ankyramorph sauropsids from the middle Pennsylvanian to the middle Guadalupian epoch (Moscovian - Wordian stages) of Europe, North America and Asia. It was named by the Russian paleontologist Ivachnenko in 1980, and it contains two families Acleistorhinidae and Lanthanosuchidae.

== Phylogeny ==
Lanthanosuchoidea is a node-based taxon defined in 1997 as "the most recent common ancestor of Lanthanosuchus, Lanthaniscus, and Acleistorhinus". The cladogram below follows the topology from a 2011 analysis by Ruta et al.

- Lanthanosuchoidea
  - Chalcosaurus rossicus
  - Lanthaniscus efremovi
  - Lanthanosuchus watsoni
  - Acleistorhinidae
    - Acleistorhinus pteroticus
    - Colobomycter pholeter

The cladogram below follows the topology from a 2016 analysis by MacDougall et al.

- Lanthanosuchoidea
  - Feeserpeton
  - - - Lanthanosuchus
      - Acleistorhinus
    - - Delorhynchus
      - - Colobomycter pholeter
        - Colobomycter vaughni

However, the phylogenetic analysis conducted by Cisneros et al. (2021) did not recover a clade uniting lanthanosuchids and acleistorhinids to the exclusion of all other parareptiles. Instead, acleistorhinids were recovered as the sister group of the clade Procolophonia, while lanthanosuchids were recovered within the procolophonian subgroup Pareiasauromorpha.
