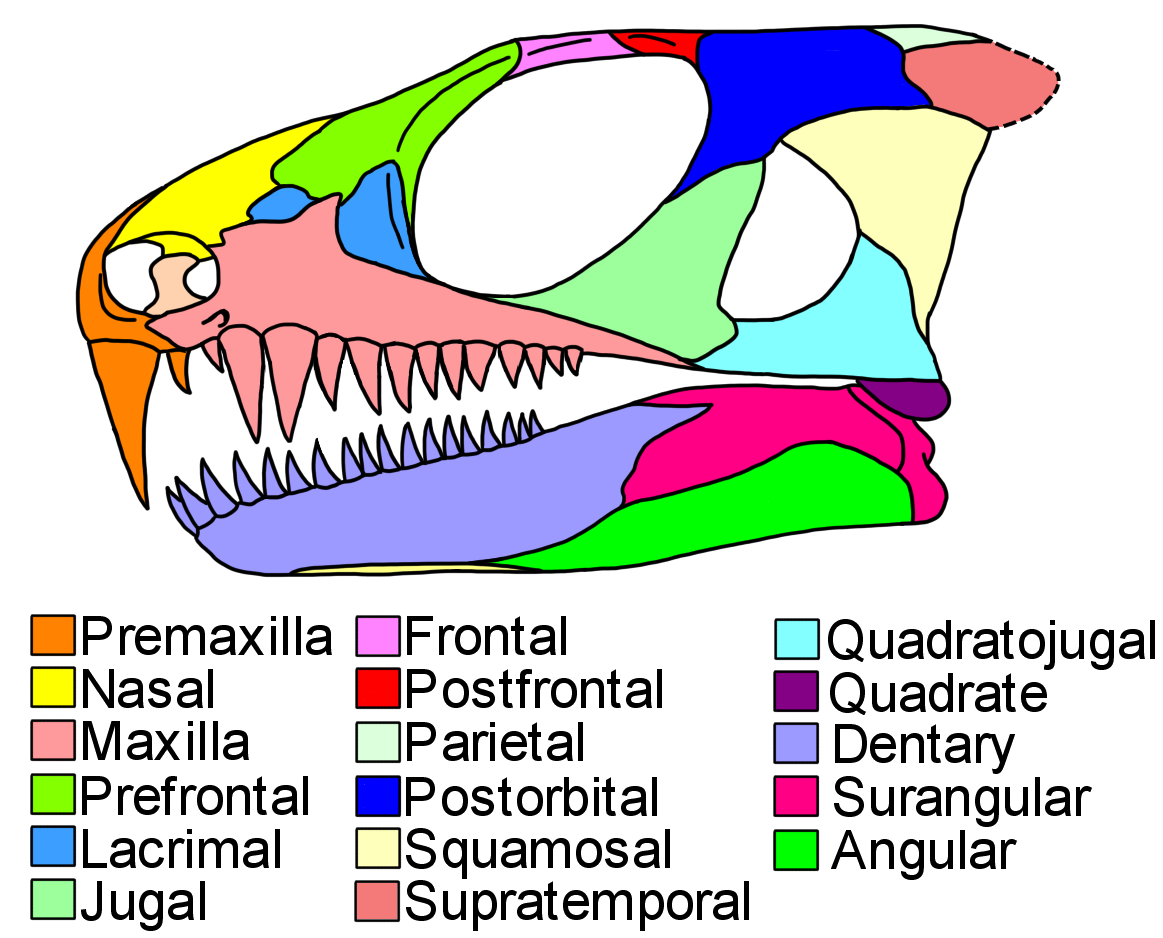
- Skull reconstruction of Colobomycter pholeter
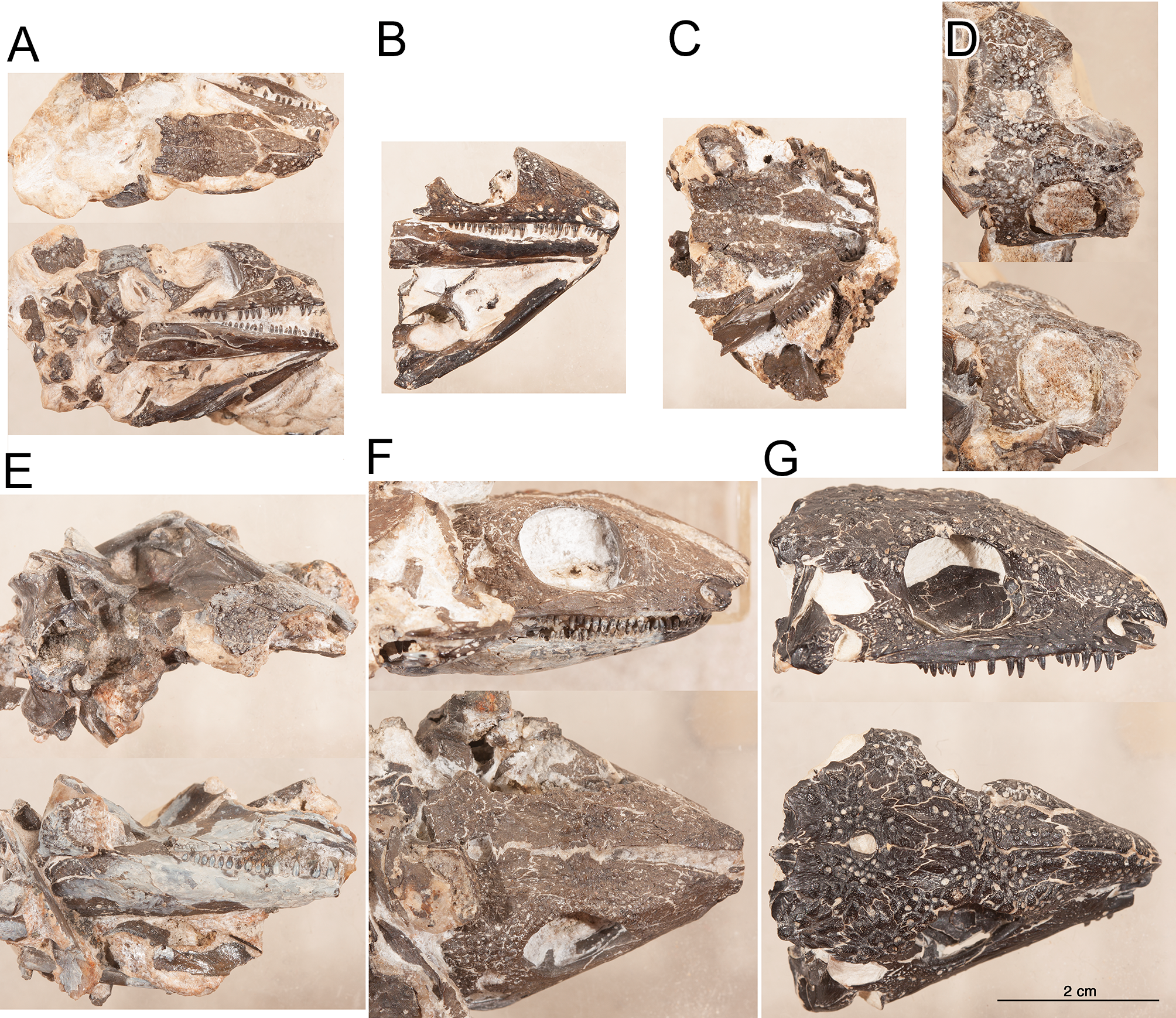
- Skulls of Delorhynchus

Scientific classification
- Kingdom: Animalia
- Phylum: Chordata
- Class: Reptilia
- Clade: †Ankyramorpha
- Family: †Acleistorhinidae; Daly, 1969

Genera
- †Acleistorhinus; †Carbonodraco?; †Colobomycter; †Delorhynchus; †Feeserpeton; †Karutia; †Klastomycter

= Acleistorhinidae =

Acleistorhinidae Temporal range: Late Carboniferous - Early Permian, 306–271.6 Ma

Extinct family of reptiles

Acleistorhinidae is an extinct family of small-lizard like sauropsids from the Late Carboniferous and Early Permian (Moscovian to Kungurian stage) of North America and South America.

== Description ==
Acleistorhinids were small and superficially lizard-like in appearance, with Karutia having an estimated skull length of 4 centimetres (1.6 in) and total body length of 25 centimetres (9.8 in). All acleistorhinids appear to have possessed a temporal fenestra (opening) in their skulls. The limbs of Karutia appear to have been relatively slender and elongate. The family is diagnosed by the presence two synapomorphies: (1) the largest tooth is located far anteriorly (towards the tip of the snout) on the maxilla; and (2) cranial ornamentation consists of sparse and shallow circular dimples.

== Taxonomy ==
Acleistorhinidae is defined as a node based clade including the last common ancestor of Acleistorhinus pteroticus and Colobomycter pholeter and all its descendants. Acleistorhinids are most diverse from the Richards Spur locality of the Early Permian of Oklahoma. Richards Spur acleistorhinids include Acleistorhinus, Colobomycter, Delorhynchus, Feeserpeton and Klastomycter. Other taxa include Carbonodraco from the Late Carboniferous of Ohio and Karutia from the Early Permian of Brazil. Acleistorhinidae is commonly considered a subgroup of lanthanosuchoids, related to taxa such as Chalcosaurus, Lanthaniscus and Lanthanosuchus. However, a re-examination of parareptile phylogeny conducted by Cisneros et al. (2021) argued that lanthanosuchids were not closely related to acleistorhinids. The phylogenetic analysis conducted by these authors recovered acleistorhinids as the sister group of the clade Procolophonia, while lanthanosuchids were recovered within the procolophonian subgroup Pareiasauromorpha. Acleistorhinids have often also historically been considered "parareptiles", though the validity of this grouping has also recently been brought into question. Jenkins et al. 2025 placed Acleistorhinidae in the clade Neoreptilia, as part of the subgroup Ankyramorpha alongside Procolophonia, and found Lanthanosuchus was not even a reptile at all, but a stem-amniote.

== Paleobiology ==
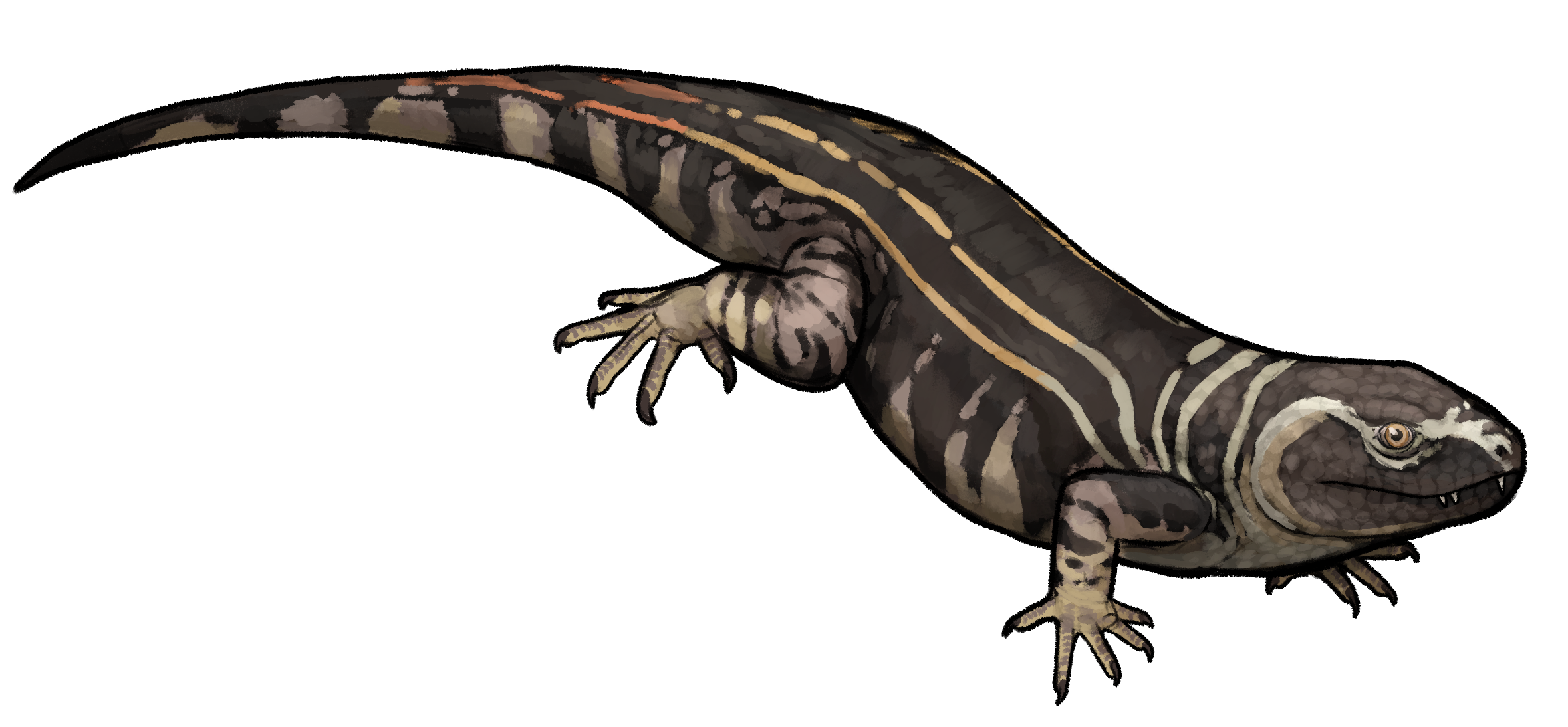
Life restoration of Carbonodraco

Two specimens of acleistorhinids described from the Richards Spur fissure-fill locality in Oklahoma have provided compelling evidence of the diet of acleistorhinids. One specimen, OMNH 73362, was later referred to Delorhynchus cifellii, a species named in 2014. The other specimen, OMNH 73364, has not been formally described. Fragments of arthropod cuticles are present in between the many palatal teeth of both skulls. The fragments in OMNH 73362 are thought to be the segments of an antenna, while the fragments in OMNH 73364 are thought to be part of a cercus.

In acleistorhinids, the marginal teeth, which are small and recurved, are suggestive of an insectivorous diet, as they probably were used for gripping and piercing arthropod cuticle. The denticulated palate, with three pairs of tooth fields and smaller teeth in between the fields, is seen as an adaptation for holding food in the oral cavity.

The teeth, which possess cutting edges, may also have been suitable for a carnivorous diet in which vertebrate flesh may have been consumed. It is possible that acleistorhinids would have preyed on tetrapods that were small enough to swallow whole. It is likely that one acleistorhinid, Colobomycter pholeter, specialized either on invertebrates with hard cuticles or on small tetrapods.

== Phylogeny ==
Internal phylogeny after Cisneros et al. 2021:

- Acleistorhinidae
  - Acleistorhinus
  - Feeserpeton
  - - - Karutia
      - Delorhynchus
    - - Carbonodraco
      - Colobomycter pholeter
      - Colobomycter vaughni

Cladogram of Sauropsida/Reptilia after Jenkins et al. 2025, with former parareptiles labelled in orange:

- Sauropsida
  - †Araeoscelidia
  - - †Bolosauridae
    - - †Erpetonyx
      - Neoreptilia
        - †Ankyramorpha
          - †Acleistorhinidae
            - - †Acleistorhinus
              - †Feeserpeton
            - - †Colobomycter
              - †Delorhynchus
          - †Procolophonia
            - †Pareiasauromorpha
            - †Procolophonoidea
        - - †Mesosauridae
          - - - †Cabarzia
              - - †Ascendonanus
                - †Orovenator
            - Parapleurota
              - †Millerettidae
              - Neodiapsida
                - †Saurosternon
                - †Younginidae
                - - †Tangasauridae
                  - - †Weigeltisauridae
                    - - †Claudiosaurus
                      - Sauria
                        - Lepidosauromorpha
                        - Archosauromorpha
