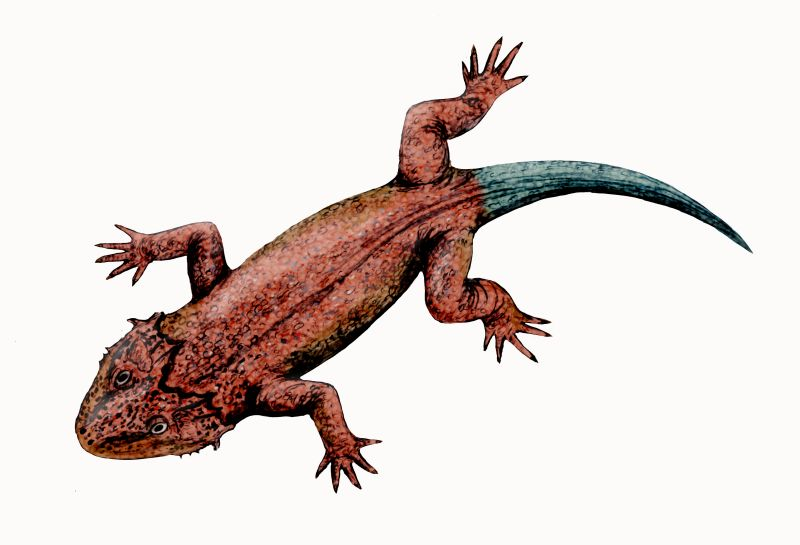
- A restoration of Lanthanosuchus

Scientific classification
- Kingdom: Animalia
- Phylum: Chordata
- Class: Reptilia
- Superfamily: †Lanthanosuchoidea
- Family: †Lanthanosuchidae; Efremov, 1946

Genera
- †Chalcosaurus; †Lanthaniscus?; †Lanthanosuchus

= Lanthanosuchidae =

Lanthanosuchidae Temporal range: Permian, 268–255 Ma

Extinct family of reptiles

Lanthanosuchidae is a family of procolophonomorph stem-reptiles that lived 268–255 million years ago. The group was named in 1946 by Ivan Antonovich Efremov.
