= Nazária =

- Municipality
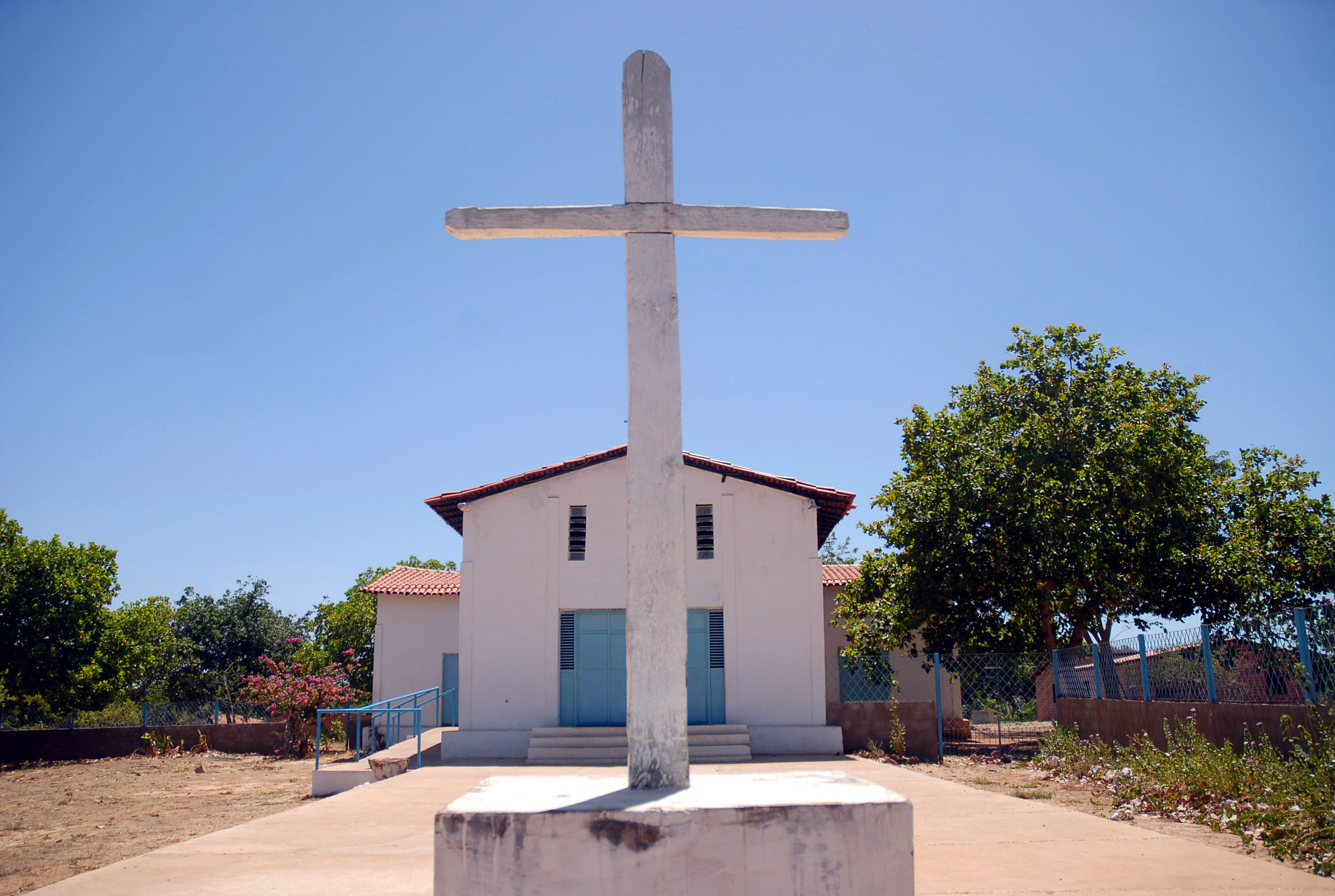

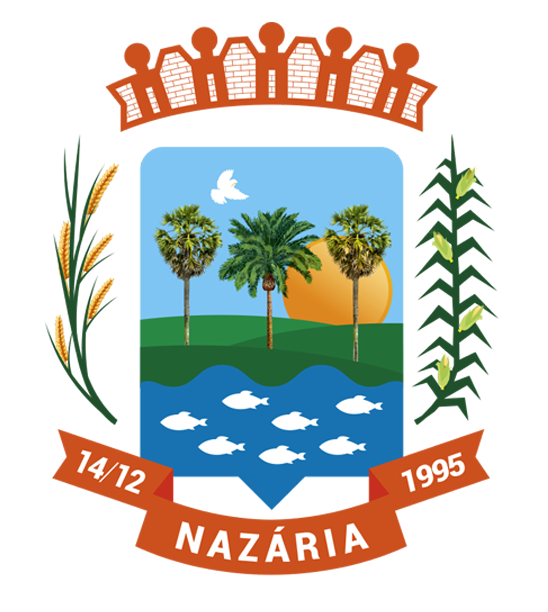
- Coat of arms

- Location in Piauí state

- Location in Brazil
- Coordinates: 5°21′39″S 42°48′30″W
- Country: Brazil
- Region: Northeast
- State: Piauí
- Mesoregion: North-Central Piauí
- Microregion: Teresina
- Established: 13th of November, 1993

Government
  - Mayor: Joaquim Nonato Da Silva Filho (Brazilian Democratic Movement)
  - Deputy mayor: Cícero De Carvalho Soares Filho

Area
  - Total: 362.376 km^{2} (139.914 sq mi)

Population (2022)
  - Total: 10,262
  - Density: 28.319/km^{2} (73.345/sq mi)
- Demonym: Nazarene
- Time zone: UTC−3 (BRT)
- Postal code: 64415-000
- Area code: 86

Nazária is a municipality in the state of Piauí in the Northeast region of Brazil. Its population is 10,262 (2022) and its area is 362.376 km^{2}.

Until 2005, the Brazilian Institute of Geography and Statistics could not recognise Nazária as a municipality because no mayoral election had taken place.

== Forest Cover ==
Nazária has 193.4 km^{2} of forest as of 2025. Global Nature Watch reported the loss of 6.6 km^{2} in 2025. Despite the forest clearing, Global Nature Watch reported a net carbon sink of −31 ktCO_{2} per year across 2001–2025.

The forests in Nazária are part of the Cerrado ecoregion.

== See also ==
- List of municipalities in Piauí
