= Lanthaniscus =

Lanthaniscus Temporal range: Middle Permian, 270–265.8 Ma

Scientific classification
- Kingdom: Animalia
- Phylum: Chordata
- Class: Reptilia
- Family: †Lanthaniscidae; Ivakhnenko, 2008
- Genus: †Lanthaniscus; Ivakhnenko, 1980

Type species
- †Lanthaniscus efremovi Ivakhnenko, 1980

Extinct genus of stem-reptile

Lanthaniscus is an extinct genus of lanthanosuchoid 'parareptile' known from the Guadalupian epoch (Late Roadian to latest Wordian age) of Eastern Europe, Russia. Lanthaniscus was first named by M. F. Ivakhnenko in 1980 and the type species is Lanthaniscus efremovi. L. efremovi was originally described on the basis of the holotype, PIN 3706/9, from Peza-1 locality, Krasnoshchel' Formation, of Arkhangelsk. Various authors had assigned it to the family Lanthanosuchidae; however, Ivakhnenko, who described an additional specimen of L. efremovi in 2008, assigned Lanthaniscus to its own family, the Lanthaniscidae. The additional specimen PIN 4543/2, was collected from the same formation as the holotype, from the Nisogora locality, which is slightly younger in age.
