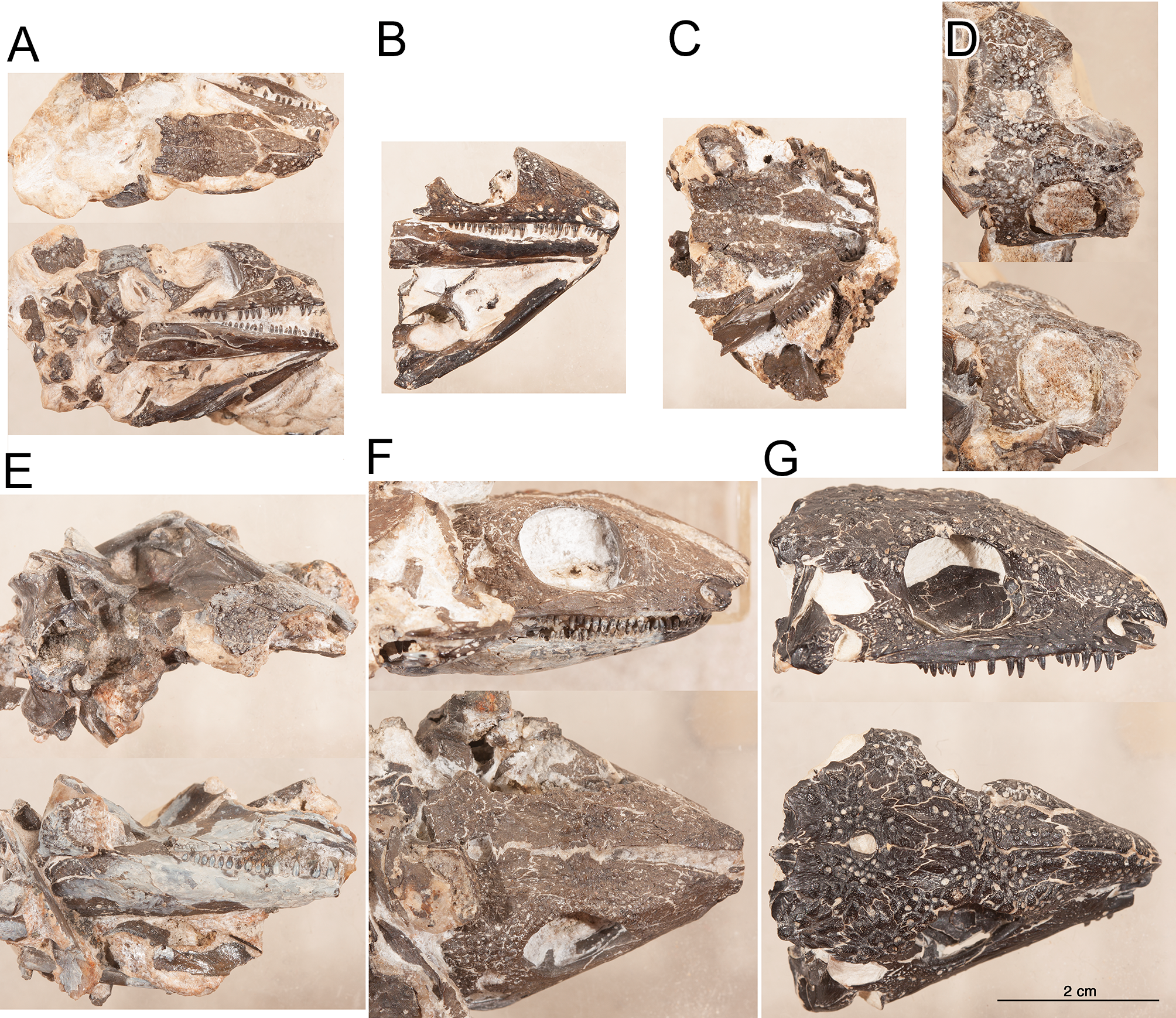
- Different skulls of Delorhynchus cifellii in various growth stages

Scientific classification
- Kingdom: Animalia
- Phylum: Chordata
- Class: Reptilia
- Subclass: †Parareptilia
- Order: †Procolophonomorpha
- Superfamily: †Lanthanosuchoidea
- Genus: †Delorhynchus; Fox, 1962

Type species
- †Delorhynchus priscus Fox, 1962

Other species
- D. cifellii Reisz et al., 2014; D. multidentatus Rowe et al., 2021

Synonyms
- Bolterpeton carrolli Anderson and Reisz, 2003 (syn. either of D. priscus or of D. cifellii)

= Delorhynchus =

Delorhynchus Temporal range: Early Permian, Artinskian

Extinct genus of reptiles

Delorhynchus is an extinct genus of acleistorhinid stem reptile known from the late Early Permian (Artinskian age) Garber Formation of Comanche County, Oklahoma. It contains three species: the type species D. priscus is based on a series of maxillae. The second species to be described, D. cifellii, is known from a larger number of well-preserved skulls and skeletal material. The third species, D. multidentatus, is based on a fragmentary skull with several rows of teeth on its jaw.

== Discovery ==
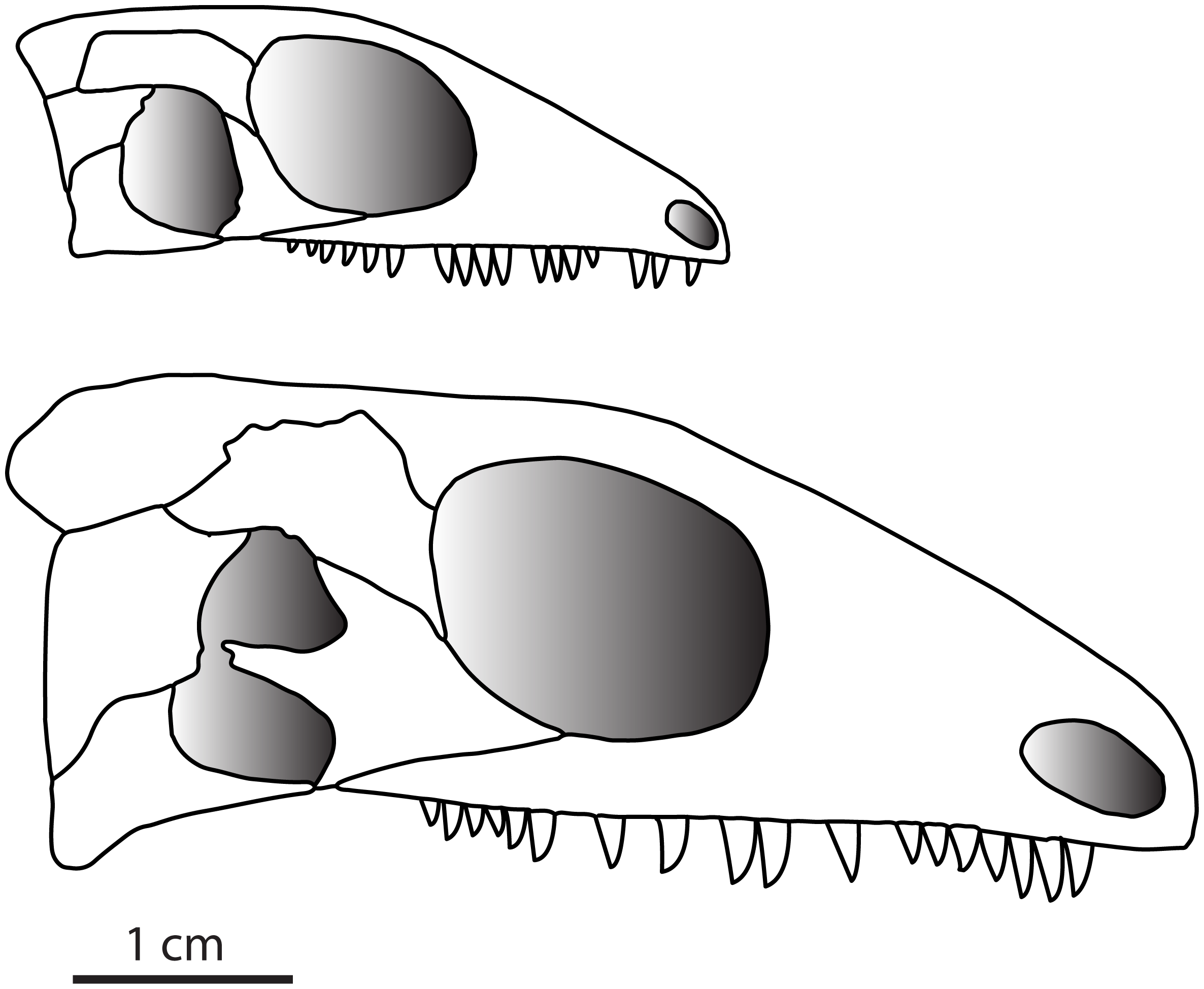
Reconstruction of the youngest and most mature skulls of D. cifellii

The type species, D. priscus, was first described and named by Richard C. Fox in 1962. The generic name "Delorhynchus" is derived from Greek rhynchos/ρυγχος, meaning "beak" (a common suffix for extinct reptile genera names). The specific name of the type species D. priscus is derived from Greek πρίσκος, meaning "ancient" or "venerable" in reference to the fragmentary nature of the known remains. D. priscus is known from the holotype KU 11117, a fragmentary left maxilla bearing 4 teeth, and from the fragmentary referred specimens KU 11118 and KU 11119, a right and a left maxillae respectively, each bearing 4 teeth. All known specimens of D. priscus are housed at the University of Kansas Natural History Museum in Lawrence, Kansas.

D. cifellii was first described and named by Robert R. Reisz, Mark J. Macdougall and Sean P. Modesto in 2014. Its specific name honors Dr. Richard L. Cifelli, a paleontologist at the Sam Noble Oklahoma Museum of Natural History (OMNH), for his contributions to the paleontology of Oklahoma and support in studying D. cifellii. Unlike the type species, D. cifellii is known from a well-preserved partial subadult skeleton, an isolated adult skull, and other disarticulated elements, all housed at the OMNH. The subadult individual preserves both the partial skull and the postcranial remains in articulation, and thus was chosen as the holotype, represented by OMNH 73515. OMNH 73362 represents the complete skull of the large, adult, individual. Other remains referred to D. cifellii include OMNH 73363, a complete right mandibular ramus of an individual equal in size to OMNH 73362, as well as the right maxilla OMNH 73524.

D. multidentatus was described by Dylan C.T. Rowe, Diane M. Scott, Joseph J. Bevitt, and Robert Reisz in 2021. It is based on ROMVP 87042, a fragmentary skull housed in the Royal Ontario Museum of Toronto. It was named in reference to the multiple rows of teeth on the lower jaw of the skull, a unique feature which distinguished it from other Delorhynchus species.

Delorhynchus is only found in the fissure fill claystone and conglomerate of OMNH Locality V51. This locality, also known as Richards Spur, is found at the Dolese Brothers limestone quarry near Fort Sill in Comanche County, Oklahoma. The fissure fill deposits of Richards Spur are probably equivalent to the Garber Formation of Oklahoma and the Arroyo Formation of Texas. Uranium-Lead dating of speleotherms in the cave deposits suggest that the fossils of Richards Spur were deposited in the Artinskian stage of the Cisuralian (Early Permian).

== Classification ==
Until recently, the phylogenetic position of Delorhynchus within Procolophonomorpha was uncertain, due to the fragmentary nature of the remains of D. priscus. However, with the description of D. cifellii by Reisz et al. (2014), Delorhynchus could be added for the first time into a phylogenetic analysis to resolve its position. Reisz et al. (2014) recovered Delorhynchus in a sister taxon position to the clade formed by Acleistorhinus and Lanthanosuchus. Thus Delorhynchus was either considered to be the sister taxon of Lanthanosuchoidea, or a basal lanthanosuchoid, depending on the definition of Lanthanosuchoidea used. The following cladogram is simplified after the phylogenetic analysis of MacDougall and Reisz (2014), an updated version of Reisz et al. (2014), and shows the placement of D. cifellii within Parareptilia. Relationships within bolded clades are not shown.

- Parareptilia
  - Mesosaurus
  - - **Millerosauria**
    - Procolophonomorpha
      - Australothyris smithi
      - Hallucicrania (=Ankyramorpha)
        - Lanthanosuchoidea
          - Feeserpeton oklahomensis
          - - - Colobomycter pholeter
              - **Delorhynchus cifellii**
            - - Acleistorhinus pteroticus
              - Lanthanosuchus watsoni
        - - Microleter mckinzieorum
          - - Bolosauridae
              - Belebey chengi
              - Eudibamus cursoris
            - Procolophonia
              - Pareiasauromorpha
                - **Nycteroleteridae**
                - **Pareiasauria**
              - - Nyctiphruretidae
                  - Abyssomedon williamsi
                  - Nyctiphruretus acudens
                - Procolophonoidea
                  - **Owenettidae**
                  - **Procolophonidae**

== Paleoecology ==
The Richards Spur locality presents a very rich Early Permian vertebrate paleofauna, including species of chondrichthyes, lepospondyls, seymouriamorphs, basal synapsids, and basal eureptiles. At least six species of parareptiles have been described apart from the three Delorhynchus species. They include the basal parareptile Microleter mckinzieorum, the bolosaurid Bolosaurus grandis, the nyctiphruretid Abyssomedon williamsi, and three other lanthanosuchoids: Colobomycter pholeter, Colobomycter vaughni, and Feeserpeton oklahomensis.
