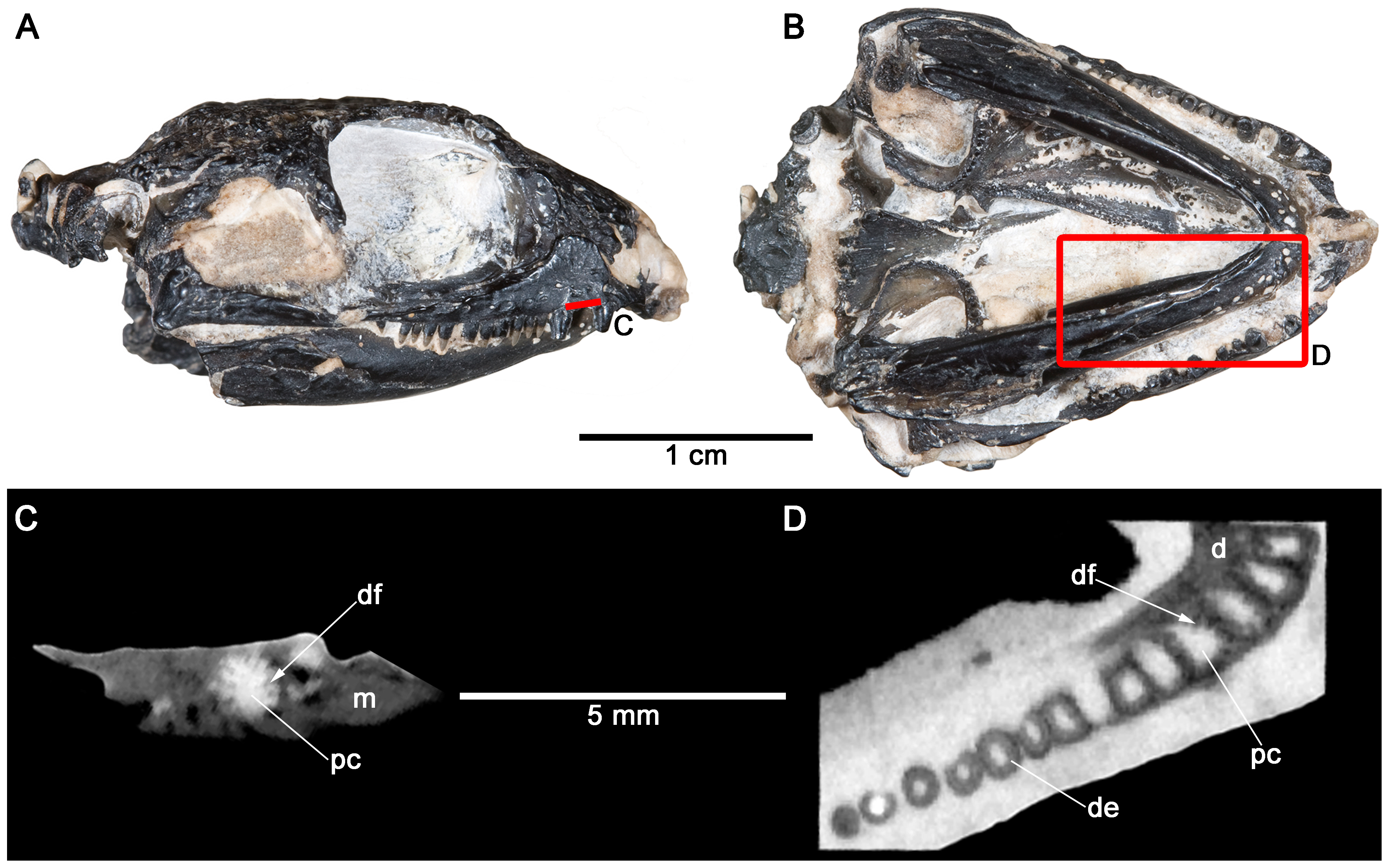
- Cross-sectional views of the maxillary and dentary dentition

Scientific classification
- Kingdom: Animalia
- Phylum: Chordata
- Class: Reptilia
- Subclass: †Parareptilia
- Order: †Procolophonomorpha
- Superfamily: †Lanthanosuchoidea
- Genus: †Feeserpeton; MacDougall and Reisz, 2012

Type species
- †Feeserpeton oklahomensis MacDougall and Reisz, 2012

= Feeserpeton =

Feeserpeton Temporal range: Early Permian, 289 Ma

Extinct genus of reptiles

Feeserpeton is an extinct genus of parareptile from the Early Permian of Richard's Spur, Oklahoma. It is known from a single species, Feeserpeton oklahomensis, which was named in 2012 on the basis of a nearly complete skull. Feeserpeton is a member of the clade Lanthanosuchoidea and is one of the earliest parareptiles.

== Description ==
The only known skull of Feeserpeton is small, but well-fused bones, deep pitting, and worn teeth indicate that the individual was close to maturity when it died. Large eye sockets may indicate that Feeserpeton was nocturnal. The skull is nearly complete, missing parts of the premaxilla (a bone at the tip of the snout) and the jugal (a bone making up the "cheek" region). A combination of features distinguish Feeserpeton from other related parareptiles, including a triangular skull, large caniniform teeth in the upper and lower jaws, and postorbital bones behind the eye sockets that are much larger than the nearby squamosal bones. Part of the palate is exposed on the right side of the skull, revealing many worn palatal teeth. The teeth in the mandible or lower jaw are hidden beneath the bones of the upper jaw, but CT scanning has revealed that there is a single tooth row on each side with mostly small teeth. Two teeth are much larger than the rest, similar in size to the enlarged caniniforms of the upper jaw. The braincase is preserved at the back of the skull and includes the stapes, a bone rarely preserved in parareptile fossils. Feeserpeton has a large opisthotic bone in its braincase, similar in size to that of another Early Permian parareptile called Acleistorhinus.

== Discovery ==
The holotype skull of Feeserpeton, cataloged as OMNH 73541, was found in the Dolese Brothers Limestone Quarry near the town of Richard's Spur, Oklahoma. Several other parareptiles have also been found from Richard's Spur, including Bolosaurus, Colobomycter, Delorhynchus, Microleter, and an acleistorhinid. OMNH 73541 was preserved in a clay-rich nodule of calcite which was removed during preparation. CT scans of the skull revealed many internal details. The specimen was described as a new genus and species in 2012. The genus name Feeserpeton honors Mike Feese, a manager of the Dolese Brothers quarry who was also a fossil collector, and the species name oklahomensis refers to Oklahoma, the state in which it was found.

== Phylogeny ==
Feeserpeton was included in a phylogenetic analysis when it was first named in 2012. It nested within the clade Lanthanosuchoidea, a poorly known group that includes the parareptiles Acleistorhinus and Lanthanosuchus. Feeserpeton was found to be a basal member of this group, the sister taxon of a clade including Acleistorhinus and Lanthanosuchus. Features that place Feeserpeton within Lanthanosuchoidea include a ridge on the frontal bone above the eye socket, a plate-like supraoccipital bone with a sagittal crest on the braincase, and a notch midway along the margin of the back of the skull. Feeserpeton is the oldest member of the clade. Below is a cladogram from the analysis showing the position of Feeserpeton:

- - Seymouria
  - - - Limnoscelidae
      - Diadectidae
    - Amniota
      - Synapsida
      - Reptilia
        - - Captorhinidae
          - - Paleothyris
            - - Araeoscelidia
              - Younginiformes
        - Parareptilia
          - Mesosauridae
          - - Millerosauria
              - Eunotosaurus
              - Millerettidae
            - - Microleter
              - - Australothyris
                - - Lanthanosuchoidea
                    - Feeserpeton
                    - - Lanthanosuchus
                      - Acleistorhinus
                  - - Nyctiphruretus
                    - Bolosauridae
                      - Eudibamus
                      - Belebey
                    - Procolophonia
                      - - - Macroleter
                          - - Bashkyroleter bashkyricus
                            - Bashkyroleter mesensis
                            - Nycteroleter
                            - Emeroleter
                            - Rhipaeosaurus
                        - - Bradysaurus
                          - - Pareiasuchus
                            - Scutosaurus
                      - - Procolophon
                        - - Owenetta
                          - Barasaurus
