= Acleistorhinus =

Acleistorhinus Temporal range: Early Permian
- Reconstructed skull

Scientific classification
- Kingdom: Animalia
- Phylum: Chordata
- Clade: †Ankyramorpha
- Family: †Acleistorhinidae
- Genus: †Acleistorhinus; Daly, 1969

Type species
- †Acleistorhinus pteroticus Daly, 1969

Extinct genus of reptile

Acleistorhinus is an extinct genus of acleistorhinid stem-reptile known from the Early Permian (middle Kungurian stage) Hennessey Formation of Oklahoma. The genus contains a single species, Acleistorhinus pteroticus.

== Discovery and naming ==
Acleistorhinus was described by Eleanor Daly in 1969, based on fossils found in the Early Permian outcrops of the Hennessey Formation in South Grandfield of southwestern Oklahoma.

The name Acleistorhinus combines Greek rhin (ῥῑ́ν), meaning "nose," and akleistos, Greek for "unclosed."

== Classification ==
The placement of Acleistorhinus in relation to other acleistorhinids within Ankyramorpha is shown in the cladogram below:

- †Ankyramorpha
  - †Acleistorhinidae
    - - †Acleistorhinus
      - †Feeserpeton
    - - †Colobomycter
      - †Delorhynchus
  - †Procolophonia
    - †Pareiasauromorpha
    - †Procolophonoidea

== See also ==
- Macroleter
- Lanthanosuchidae
- Parareptilia
