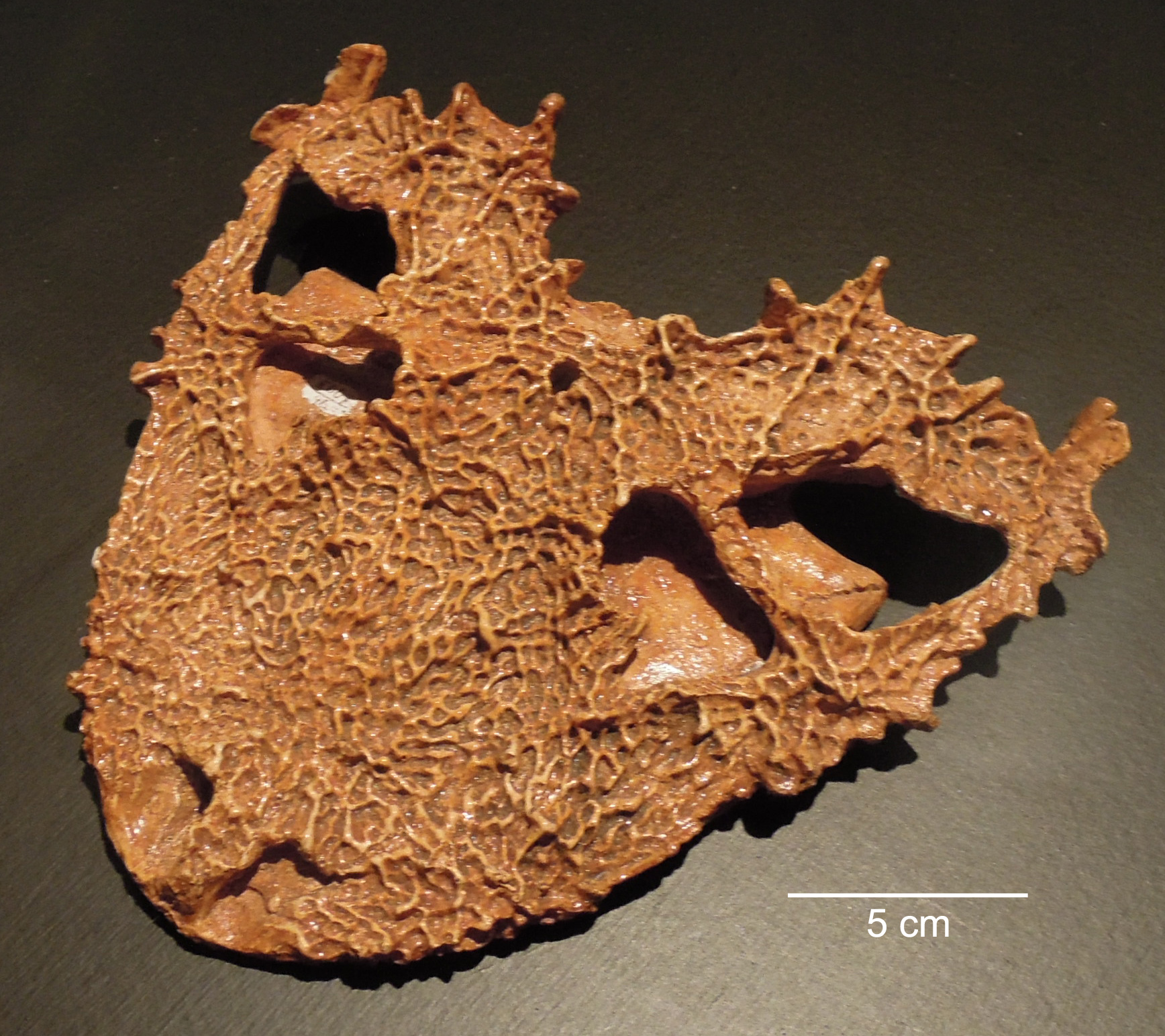
- Skull of L. watsoni

Scientific classification
- Kingdom: Animalia
- Phylum: Chordata
- Clade: Reptiliomorpha
- Genus: †Lanthanosuchus; Efremov, 1940

Species
- †Lanthanosuchus qualeni Efremov, 1940 (nomen nudum); †Lanthanosuchus watsoni Efremov, 1946

= Lanthanosuchus =

Lanthanosuchus Temporal range: Middle - Late Permian, 268–255 Ma

Extinct genus of reptiles

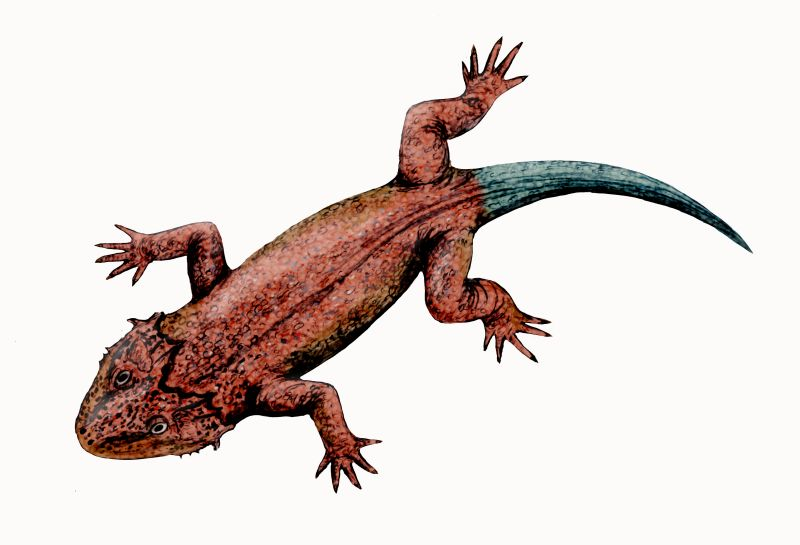
Restoration

Lanthanosuchus is an extinct genus of reptiliomorph from the Late Permian. It was found at Isheevo in Tatarstan. Lanthanosuchus had a length of 75 cm.

Traditionally recovered as a "parareptile", recent studies have instead recovered Lanthanosuchus as a reptiliomorph outside of Amniota.
