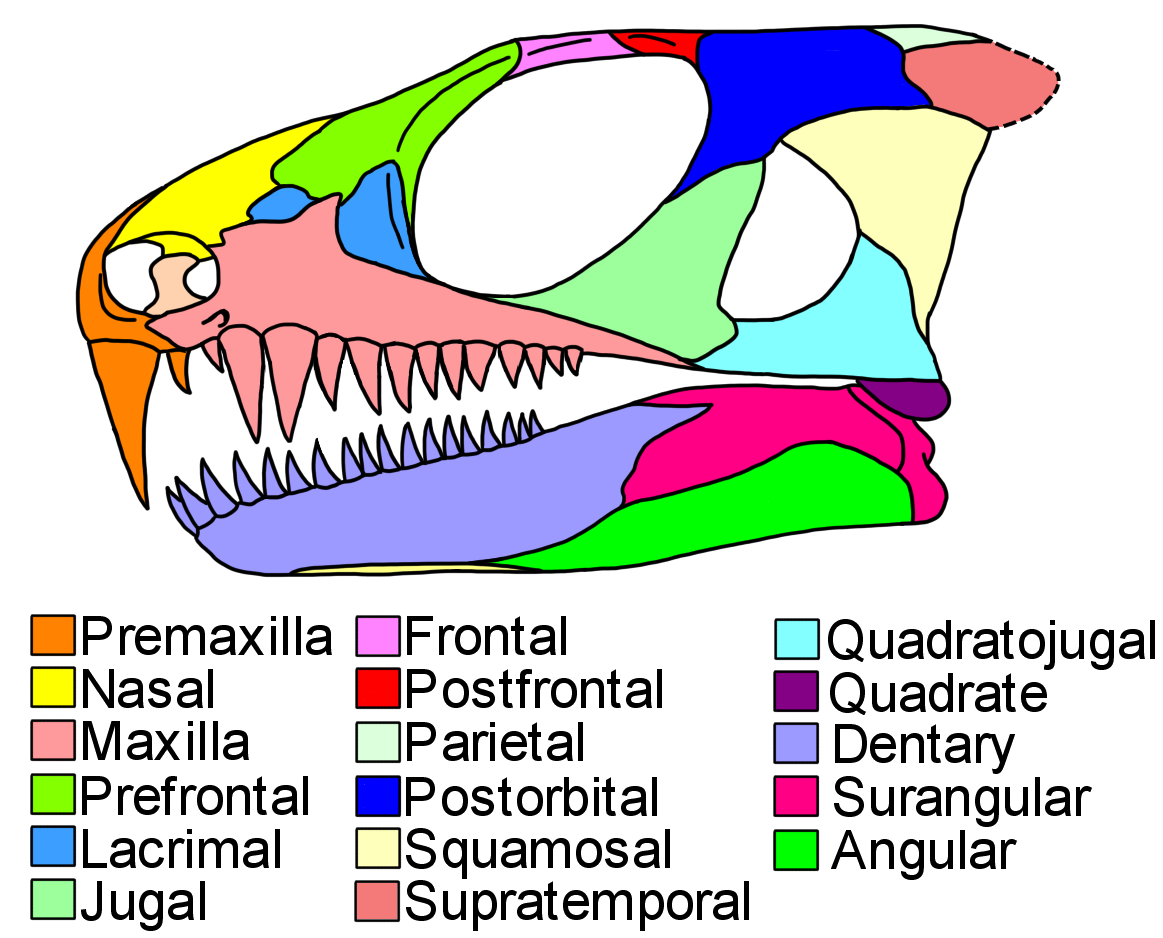
- Skull diagram of Colobomycter pholeter

Scientific classification
- Kingdom: Animalia
- Phylum: Chordata
- Class: Reptilia
- Family: †Acleistorhinidae
- Genus: †Colobomycter; Vaughn, 1958

Type species
- †Colobomycter pholeter Vaughn, 1958

Species
- C. pholeter Vaughn, 1958 (type); C. vaughni MacDougall, Modesto, & Reisz, 2016

= Colobomycter =

Colobomycter Temporal range: Early Permian, 289 Ma

Extinct genus of reptiles

Colobomycter is an extinct genus of acleistorhinid parareptile known from the Early Permian of Oklahoma.

== Discovery ==
The type species, Colobomycter pholeter, was first described from fossil remains in 1958, at which time it was believed to represent a synapsid, specifically, a pelycosaur. However, the discovery of new material and reexamination of the holotype led to its reclassification as a member of the Eureptilia. More recent studies indicate that Colobomycter is properly placed within the amniote clade Parareptilia, as part of the group Lanthanosuchoidea and closely related to the taxon Acleistorhinus. A second species of Colobomycter was described in 2016, Colobomycter vaughni.

No postcranial material is known for Colobomycter, and the skull material referred to the genus has all been recovered from a single locality, the Richards Spur site at the Dolese Brothers Limestone Quarry, 11 kilometers north of Fort Sill, Comanche County, Oklahoma, dating to the early Artinskian stage. This site comprises a fissure-fill deposit yielding a unique upland fauna. Other taxa recovered from these strata preserves a wide array of tetrapods, including lepospondyl and temnospondyl amphibians, Seymouria, microsaurs, captorhinomorphs, and synapsids.

== Description ==
The skull of Colobomycter is considered one of the most enigmatic found in any of the parareptiles primarily due to the presence of greatly enlarged caniniform teeth possessing serrated edges in the premaxilla and, to a lesser extent, the maxilla. The length of the premaxillary fang is greater than half the height of the skull. Modesto & Reisz (2008) note that "The large size of the first premaxillary tooth is [otherwise] unheard of among early reptiles."

The taxon also possesses unusual "folding" of the dentine at the bases of its larger marginal teeth, a state known as polyplycodont (a condition also seen to have evolved independently in diadectomorphs, ichthyosaurs, and mosasaurs). Modesto & Reisz (2008) speculate that hard-shelled insects and other arthropods may have formed the bulk of its diet, but that Colobomycter could also have fed on vertebrates, including small amphibians and eureptiles. It is notable as the smallest predatory amniote from the Richard's Spur deposits, with a skull measuring a mere 70-80 millimeters in length.
