= Regurgitalite =

Vomit trace fossil

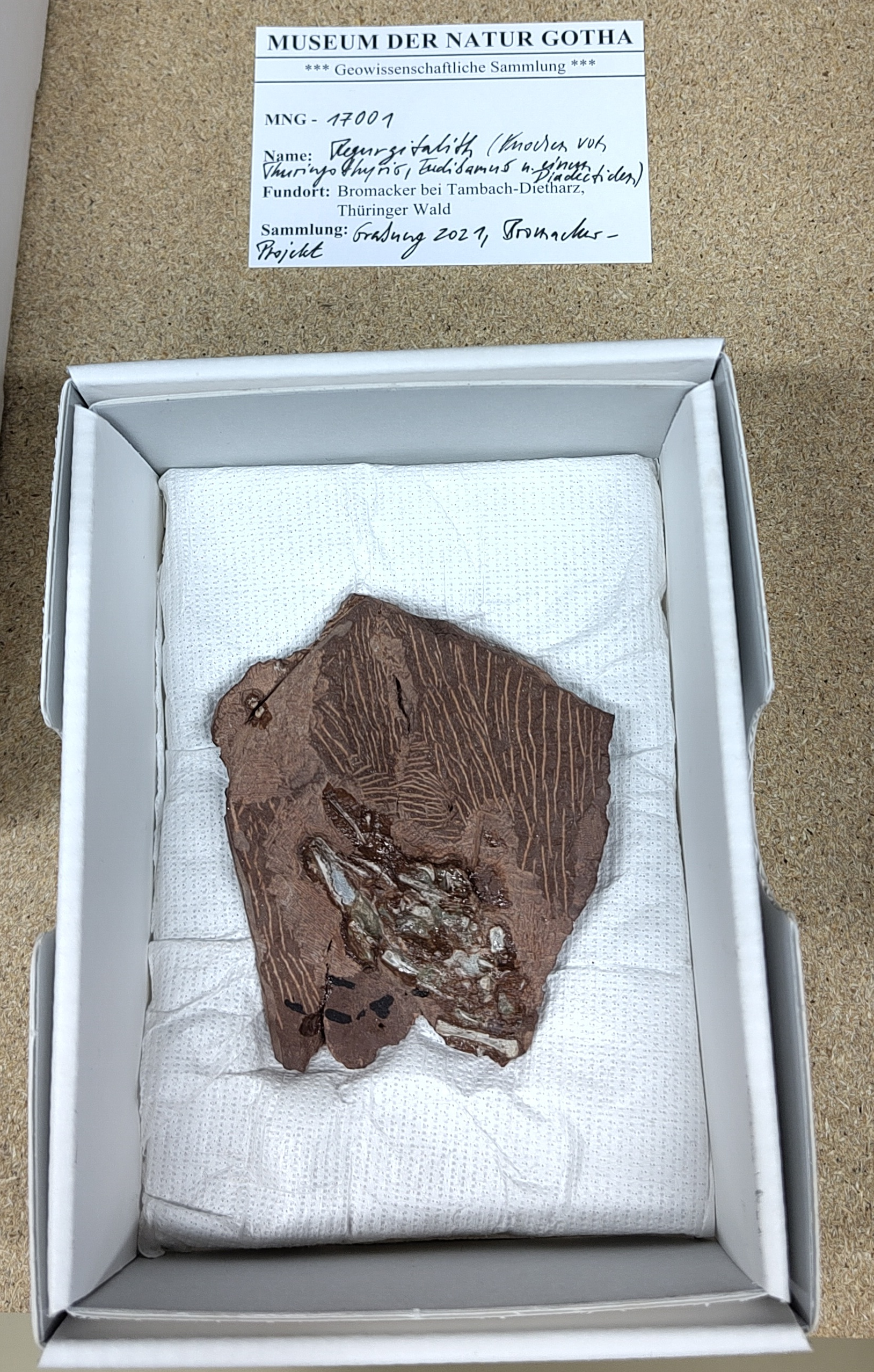
An example regurgitalite from the Bromacker site, with skeletal remains deemed to be from Thuringothyris, Eudibamus and some diadectid.

Regurgitalites, or sometimes regurgitaliths, are the fossilized remains of stomach contents or oral cavity material that has been regurgitated by an animal. Modern examples include owl pellets. They are bromalite trace fossils and can be subdivided into ichnotaxa. Regurgitalites provide valuable information about the diet and feeding behaviors of extinct animals, though they are rarely reported in the fossil record because they are difficult to identify and distinguish from coprolites.

== Terminology ==
The term "regurgitalite" was proposed by Adrian Hunt in 1992 as "consonant with coprolite and cololite, to refer to regurgitated material." The alternate spelling "regurgitalith" appeared in Bertling et al. (2006), though this was an unintentional orthographic variation rather than a proposed new term. The German synonym Speiballen (literally "vomit ball") has also been used in the literature.

More specific terminology has been developed for particular types of regurgitalites. "Strigilite" refers to fossilized owl pellets, derived from the Latin strix (owl). "Ornithoregurgitalite" is used for regurgitalites produced by birds generally, while "gastroregurgitalite" specifically refers to material regurgitated from the stomach rather than the oral cavity.

== Characteristics ==
Regurgitalites can be distinguished from coprolites by several diagnostic features, though identification often requires detailed chemical and microstructural analysis:

- Shape and thickness: Regurgitalites are typically thin and irregularly shaped, composed of randomly grouped and intermingled angular skeletal fragments of varying sizes. Coprolites, by contrast, tend to be massive, thick, and possess a more regular shape.
- Phosphatic matrix: Regurgitalites typically lack the phosphatic matrix characteristic of coprolites. The absence of this matrix reflects the shorter residence time in the digestive tract.
- Gastric etching: Bone and shell fragments in regurgitalites often show minimal gastric etching (acid damage from stomach acids), as the material was expelled before significant digestion occurred. Coprolite inclusions typically show more pronounced signs of digestion.
- Soft tissue preservation: Regurgitalites may preserve soft tissues such as muscle fibers, which would not survive passage through the entire digestive tract.
- Articulation: Skeletal remains in regurgitalites often retain some degree of articulation and show low degrees of roundness at fragment edges.

== Fossil record ==
=== Marine regurgitalites ===
Marine regurgitalites are known from various Mesozoic deposits. The Triassic Polzberg Konservat-Lagerstätte in Austria has yielded regurgitalites containing ammonoid shells and cephalopod remains, likely produced by large durophagous fish such as the cartilaginous fish Acrodus. The Jurassic Posidonienschiefer (Posidonia Shale) of Germany has produced regurgitalites containing remains of ichthyosaurs and fish, including specimens interpreted as the regurgitated meals of larger ichthyosaurs.

A notable Cretaceous example from the Chinle Formation of Arizona preserves soft tissue of the pseudosuchian archosaur Revueltosaurus, allowing researchers to definitively identify the specimen as a regurgitalite through chemical and microstructural analysis. In 2025, a 66-million-year-old regurgitalite containing crinoid (sea lily) remains was discovered in Denmark, providing evidence of predator-prey interactions just before the Cretaceous–Paleogene extinction event.

=== Terrestrial regurgitalites ===
Fossilized owl pellets (strigilites) are documented from the Oligocene Orella Member of the White River Formation in Wyoming, representing the oldest unambiguous record of fossil owl pellets. Despite frequent suggestions that owl pellets are important contributors to the Cenozoic microvertebrate fossil record, relatively few fossil owl pellets have been documented from pre-Quaternary deposits, though they are abundant in some Quaternary cave deposits.

The oldest avian gastric pellet dates to approximately 120 million years ago from the Early Cretaceous Jiufotang Formation of China, preserved in an enantiornithine bird specimen. This fossil contains fish bones and represents the earliest evidence of avian-style digestion involving pellet regurgitation.

== Scientific significance ==
Regurgitalites provide direct evidence of ancient predator-prey relationships and feeding behaviors that cannot be obtained from body fossils alone. They offer insights into the behavioral ecology and physiology of extinct species, revealing information about diet, hunting strategies, and digestive capabilities. Because regurgitated material spends less time in the digestive tract than fecal matter, regurgitalites can preserve prey items in better condition, sometimes retaining soft tissues and articulated skeletal elements.

The study of regurgitalites has contributed to understanding of ancient food chains and trophic interactions. For example, the presence of ammonoid-bearing regurgitalites in Triassic deposits supports evidence that durophagous predation was intense during this period, contributing to the "Mesozoic Marine Revolution."

== See also ==
- Bezoar
- Bromalite
- Cololite
- Coprolite
- Gastrolith
- Pellet (ornithology)
