= Tambach Formation =

Early Permian-age geologic formation in Germany

- Stratigraphic range: Early Permian (late Asselian), 295.8–294.1 Ma
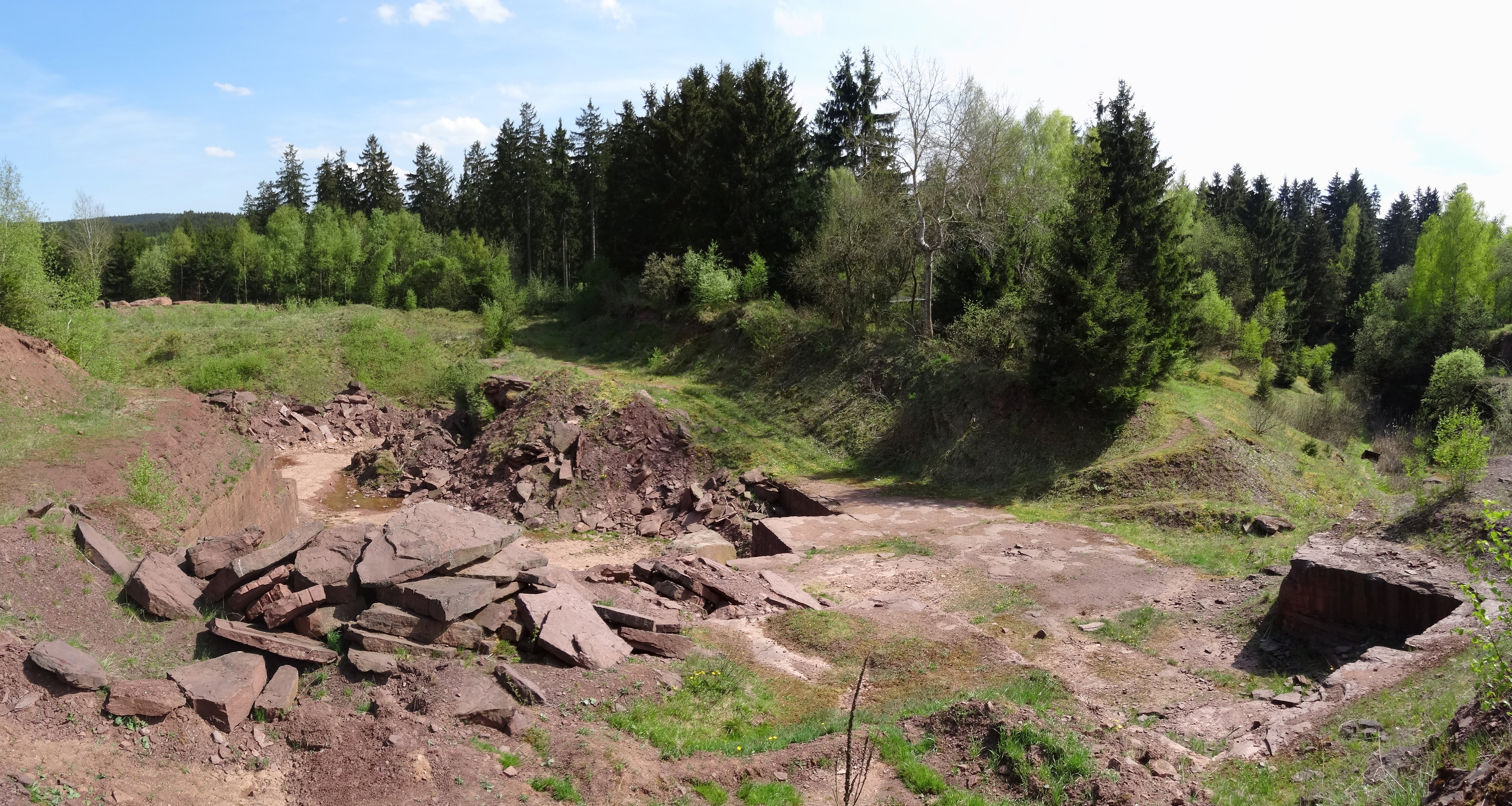
- Traco quarry at Bromacker
- Type: Geological formation
- Underlies: Eisenach Formation
- Overlies: Rotterode Formation

Lithology
- Primary: Conglomerate, sandstone, mudstone

Location
- Coordinates: 50.8097° N, 10.6189° E
- Region: Thuringia
- Country: Germany

Type section
- Named for: Tambach-Dietharz village

The Tambach Formation is an Early Permian-age geologic formation in central Germany. It consists of red to brown-colored sedimentary rocks (red beds) such as conglomerate, sandstone, and mudstone, and is the oldest portion of the Upper Rotliegend within the Thuringian Forest Basin.

The overall geology records a history with three distinct stages of sedimentation within a mountainous environment. First, tectonic activity forms a basin (the Tambach Basin) dominated by high-energy debris flows, sheetfloods, and braided rivers. These incise underlying rhyolitic rock, depositing a coarse conglomerate known as the Bielstein Conglomerate. Second, calmer conditions allow the basin to widen, and the conglomerate is marginalized by finer sediments which were previously only common at the center of the basin, such as the characteristic Tambach Sandstone. These finer sediments were deposited through repeated sequences of flooding, followed by calm water, followed by exposure to air. The overall climate would have been similar to modern tropical savannas, with hot and dry periods broken up by heavy rainfall, likely multiple times in a year. The third stage involves a return of tectonic conditions, this time inducing wide deposits of polymictic (heterogenous) conglomerate known as the Finsterbergen conglomerate.

The Tambach Formation also includes one of the most important Permian fossil localities in Europe: the Bromacker locality. This former sandstone quarry and surrounding sites preserves several different facies types, with different fossil components. Thick sandstone channel fills in the lower section at Bromacker are overlain with mudstone from ephemeral lakes. A diverse assemblage of trace fossils such as footprints are imprinted onto the mudstone drapings. The upper section of Bromacker contains siltstone deposited through sheetfloods, in which well-preserved articulated skeletons of terrestrial tetrapods have been discovered. These include early amphibians like Rotaryus and Tambaroter, and early reptiles like Eudibamus and Thuringothyris. Unlike most fossil-preserving Permian red beds, aquatic vertebrates are absent at Bromacker while carnivorous synapsids (like Dimetrodon) are rare and herbivorous diadectids are abundant. Plant and arthropod fossils have also been found in shales at Bromacker.

== History ==
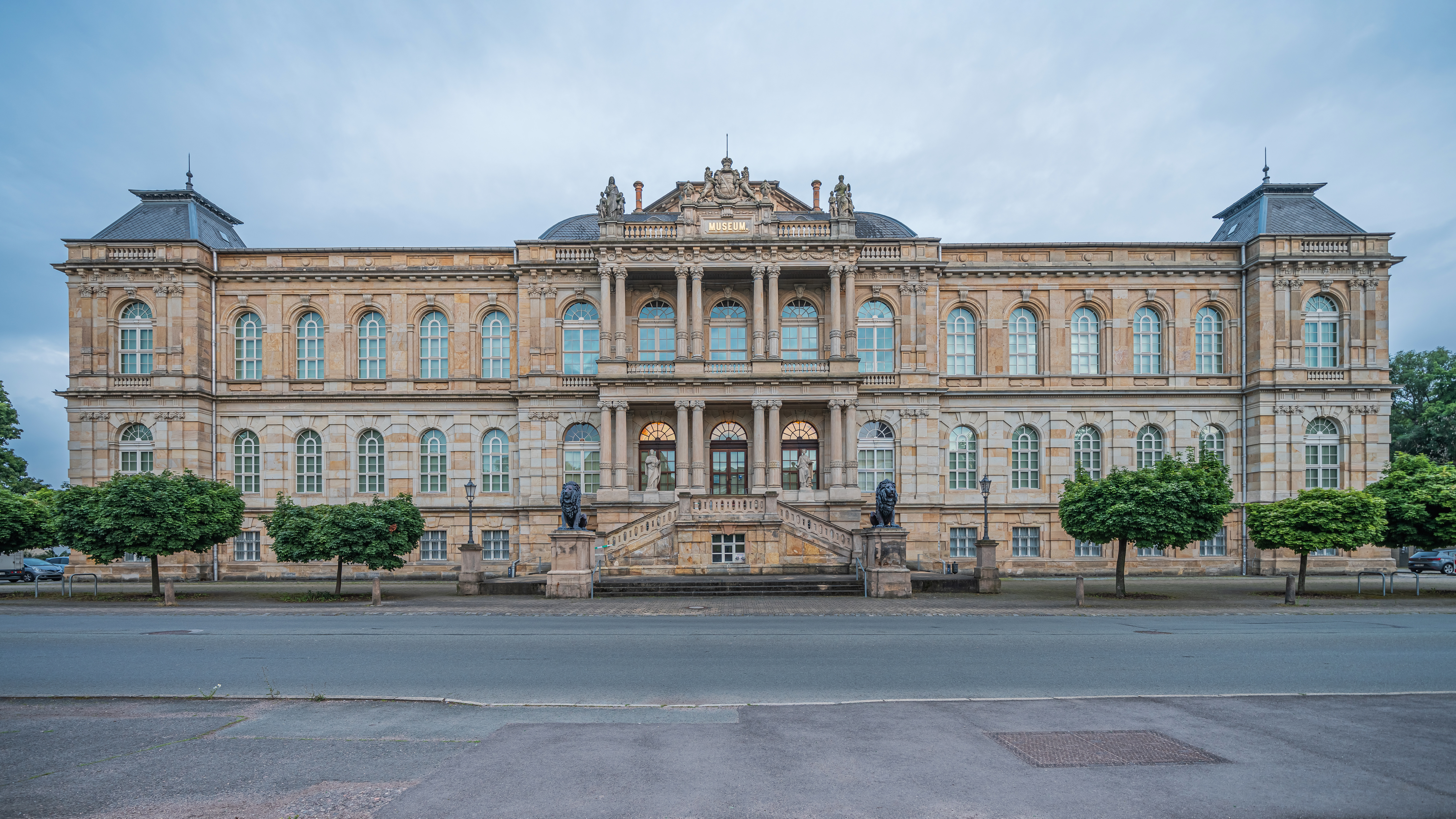
From 1887 to 2010, the Ducal (Herzogliches) Museum in Gotha housed most of the Tambach Formation's most famous fossils.

Starting in the 1840s, five-toed footprints had been described from various sandstone quarries and roadcuts in the Gotha district of Germany. The stratigraphy of rocks near Tambach-Dietharz was mapped out in 1876, and named as the "Tambacher Schichten" (Tambach strata) in 1895, although at the time it was believed to include several additional rock layers (now termed the Elgersberg and Eisenach Formations) which have since then been separated from it. in 1887 the first fossilized footprints from Bromacker were discovered by a local fossil collector named Heinrich Friedrich Schäfer. The find was donated to the Ducal Museum in the city of Gotha, after which it was independently reported on by various German paleontologists who had received photographic evidence. Wilhelm Pabst, the curator of the Ducal Museum's natural history department, collected and described 140 sandstone slabs from the Tambach Formation from 1890 until his death in 1908. The collection was rediscovered in the 1950s, and subsequently restudied by GDR paleontologists such as Hermann Schmidt, Arno Hermann Müller, and Hartmut Haubold.

Fossilized tetrapod bones were discovered in the upper beds of Bromacker by Thomas Martens in 1974, prompting further attention from Gotha paleontologists. These include Harald Lutzner, who formally delineated the Tambach Formation as a sequence including two conglomerate layers separated by a sandstone layer. In the coming years, research contacts were made with Western paleontologists such as Jürgen Boy (University of Mainz) and David Berman (Carnegie Museum of Natural History). This allowed excavation to ramp up and the Tambach Formation to achieve worldwide fame. A 1993 German-American joint expedition recovered articulated tetrapod fossils, and trace fossil collecting was resumed after more than 80 years thanks to the excavation of a new sandstone quarry at Bromacker in 1995. The first Tambach body fossils outside of Bromacker were discovered in 2008, in a construction site in downtown Tambach-Dietharz. In 2010, the exhibits comprising Gotha's Museum of Nature began the process of being moved from the Ducal Museum (which was being converted to an art museum) to the Friedenstein Castle. Due to funding issues, collecting from Bromacker has been limited and the Tambach collection is being archived at the historic Perthesforum complex prior to the construction of a new Permian exhibit.

== Geology ==
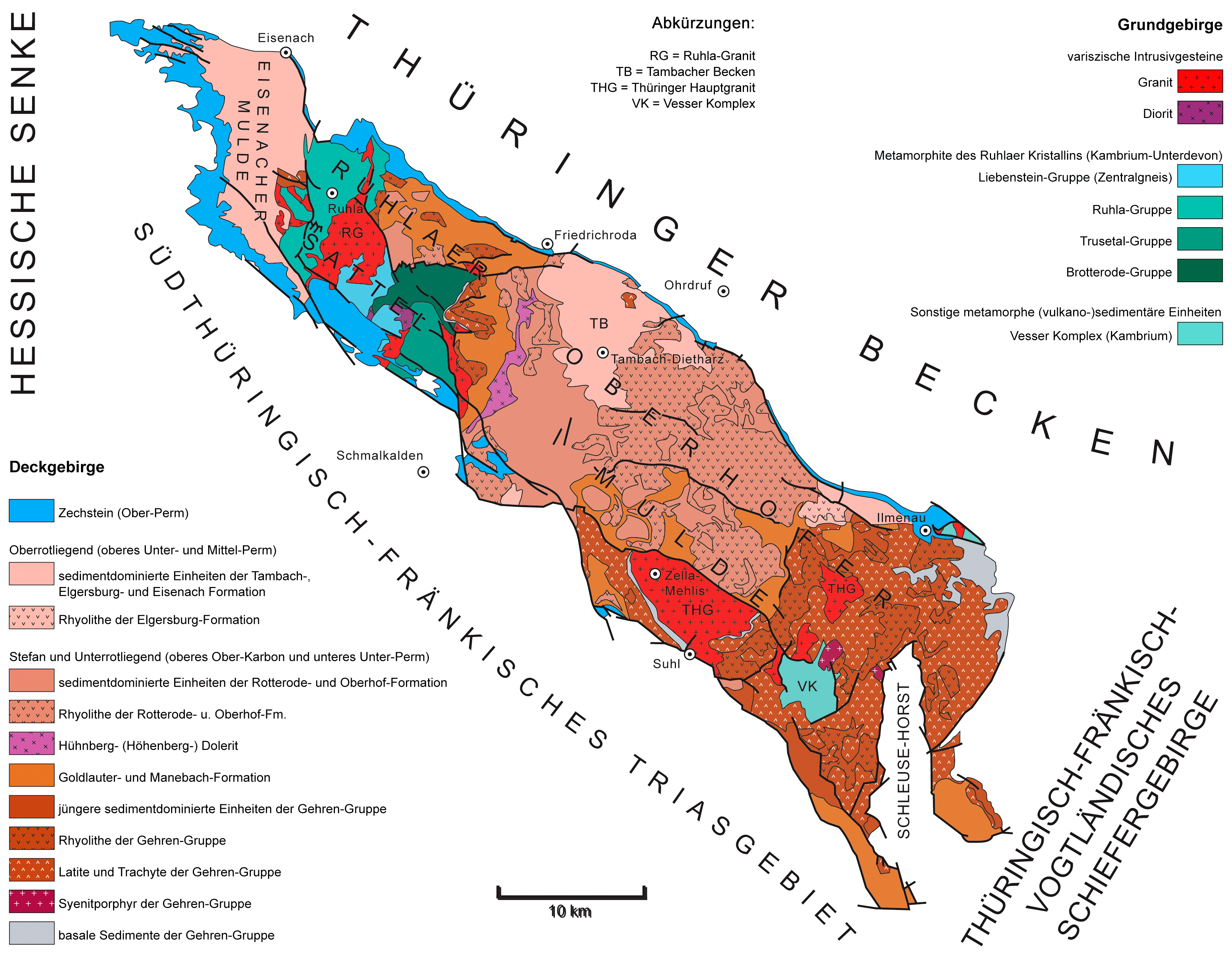
Map of the modern Thuringian Forest Basin (in German). TB = "Tambacher Becken" (Tambach Basin)

The Tambach Formation mainly lies within a basin currently occupied by the Thuringian Forest, and it is stratigraphically younger than the Rotterode Formation and older than the Eisenach Formation. It is the oldest part of the Thuringian Forest Basin's Upper Rotliegend succession, a name referring to a sequence of purely sedimentary rocks in the Lower Permian of Germany. The sediments of the Tambach Formation were deposited in a small Permian graben (termed the Tambach Basin), which was oriented in a northeast to southwest direction and incised into the igneous and sedimentary rocks of the Rotterode Formation. The Tambach Basin would have about 250 square km during the Permian, though modern outcrops only occupy about 50 square km, not counting the northeastern portion of the basin which has had its deposits erased by later geological processes.

Traditionally, the Tambach Formation is considered to be divided into three discrete layers: a lower and an upper conglomerate layer (Bielstein and Finsterbergen Konglomerate, respectively), separated by a somewhat narrower layer of finer sediments such as sandstone, the Tambach-Sandstein (Tambach sandstone) member. However, the borders between these layers are often imprecise, and some geologists have offered a more complex depositional picture with three stratigraphic stages defined by changes in basin-wide sedimentology, rather than specific rock types.

The lowest stage (stage I) experienced a period of high tectonic activity (part of the Variscan orogeny) to the southeast, the Oberhof uplift. The formation of the basin among this tectonic backdrop initially led to powerful debris flows and sheet floods, and then active braided rivers flowing along its edge with lower-energy rivers, floodplains, and lakes at its center. The coarse (cobble/boulder-scale) and rhyolitic Bielstein conglomerate was deposited among the high-energy marginal environments while early portions of the Tambach sandstone were deposited further away from the basin's edge. The most prominent flow direction in the well-preserved eastern part of the basin is northwest, towards the center of the basin.

Decreasing tectonic activity in the middle stage (stage II) leads to increased erosion, lowering the relief along the edge of the basin. As a result, the braided rivers at the edge slowed down, lowering the size of the clasts to cobble/pebble conglomerate. The center of the basin graded into small streams and marshes, depositing sandstone, siltstone, shale and mudstone in fossiliferous red beds. Although the Tambach Basin may have been hydrologically isolated during this period, with its waterways draining internally, some paleontologists instead consider its waters to flow into another basin in the northeast, which was not preserved. The last stage (stage III) experienced a return of tectonic activity (the Ruhla crystalline uplift) to the northwest, although the relief was still fair flat. Ruhla-sourced alluvial fans and braidplains became more common, gradually allowing mineral-rich and polymictic pebble-sized conglomerate to build up and expand into the center of the basin, forming the Finsterbergen conglomerate.

=== Bromacker ===
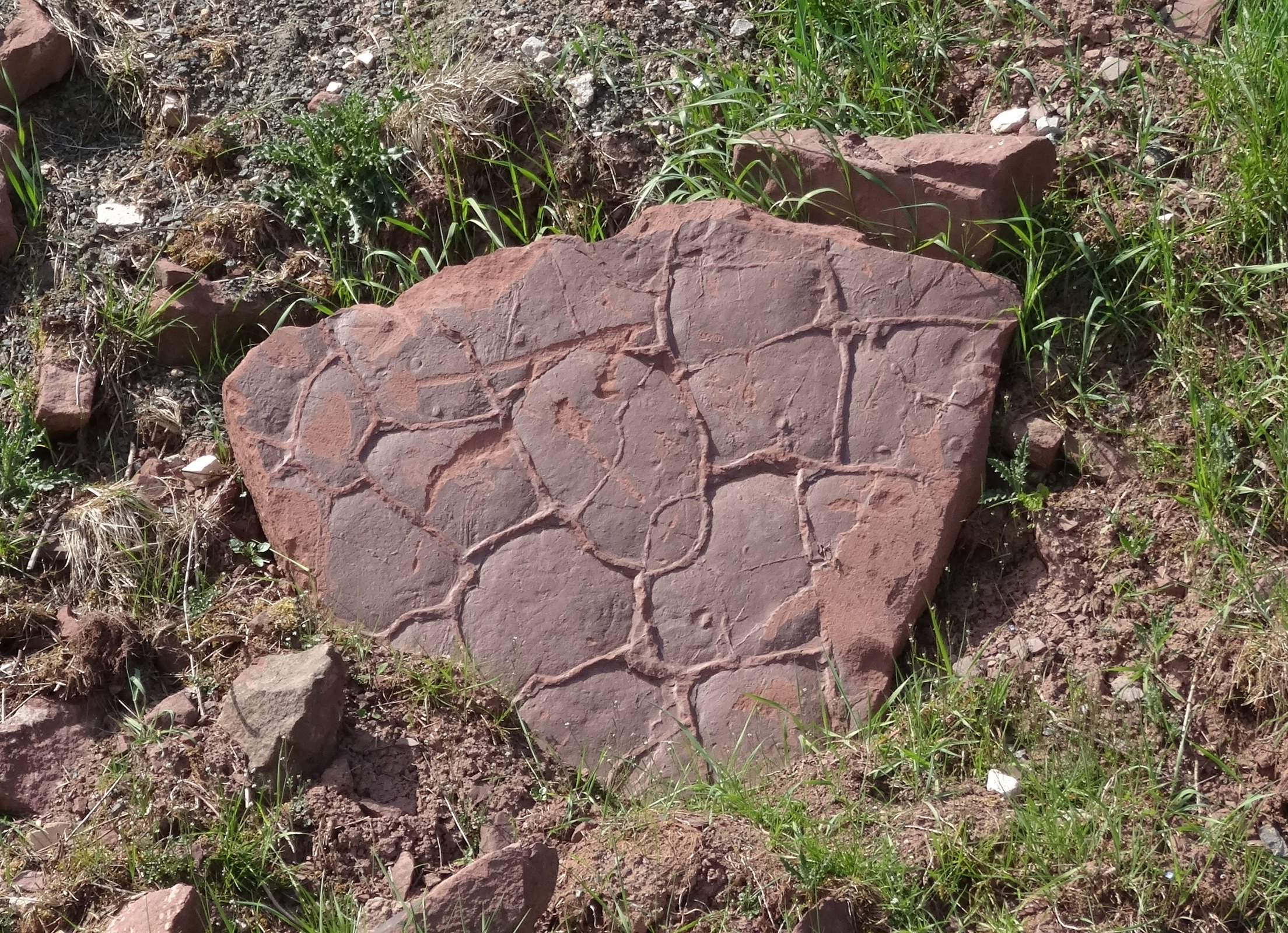
A sandstone slab from the lower beds of Bromacker, showing cracked mudstone drapings.

The most famous and fossiliferous locality within the Tambach Formation is the Bromacker locality, a cluster of small abandoned quarries near the town of Tambach-Dietharz. Strata exposed to the surface at Bromacker corresponds to the center of the Tambach Basin, during the time of the upper portion of stage I and the lower portion of stage II. Stage I sediments at Bromacker are termed the "lower beds" or "Bromacker sandstone" and stage II sediments are the "upper beds" or "Bromacker horizon".

The lower beds are dominated by thick sheets of fine-grained sandstone, often with cross-bedding indicating that the paleocurrent was oriented towards the northeast. These sandstone layers are typically blanketed by homogeneous mudstone, which sometimes preserved mudcracks, plant fossils, invertebrate burrows, and tetrapod footprints. The thick sandstone layers (and their mudstone drapings) are not continuous, interrupted by a succession of finer and darker micaceous sediments such as shale, siltstone, and (rarely) very fine sandstone. This reconstructs a sequence of repeated flooding events, involving strong, straight rivers eroding channels through the silty floodplain at the center of the basin, leaving behind sandy channel fills (sandstone) and fine-grained overbank deposits (shale and other sediments). The mudstone drapings can be explained as precipitate from extensive ephemeral lakes that evaporated in the weeks following the floods, after which they became mudflats. Many of the mudcrack fragments were ripped up by the next flood, being incorporated into the subsequent sandstone sheets as intraclasts.

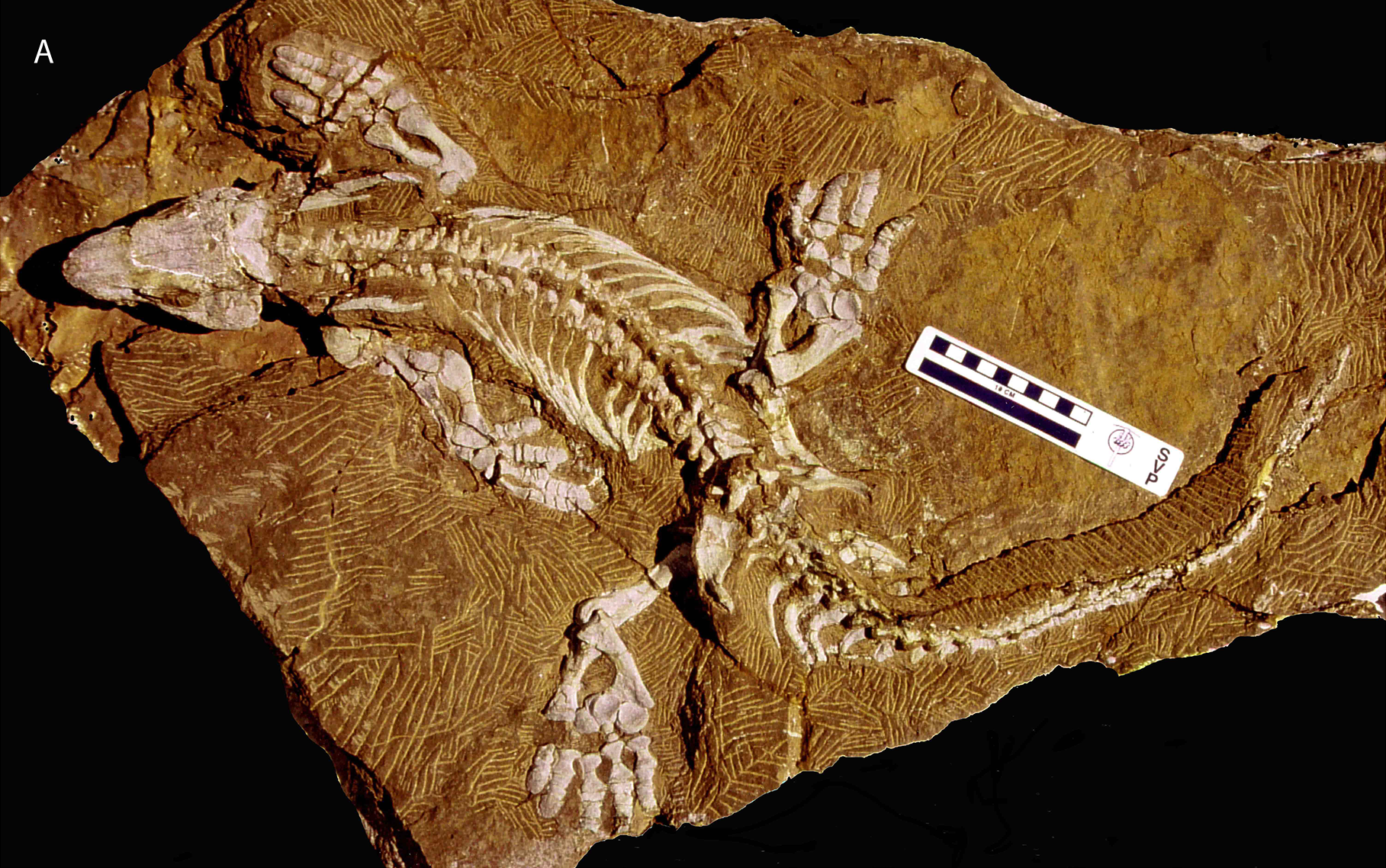
A complete and fully articulated skeleton of Orobates pabsti from the upper beds of Bromacker.

The narrower upper beds also represent alternating flooding and still water conditions, albeit with finer clasts and lower topography. The sandstone channel fills are mostly replaced by homogeneous layers of red siltstone, which were prone to breaking along sharp edges. This siltstone contained mudcrack fragments, calcite-encased roots, and well-preserved partial or articulated skeletons of terrestrial tetrapods. These sediments indicate that reduced relief in stage II of the Tambach Formation had made sheetfloods the dominant erosional force, rather than individual channels. The lowest sheetflood deposit was particularly rich in diadectid fossils. The fine sediment successions were also altered, becoming dominated by finely laminated (and only occasionally micaceous) shale in which conchostracans and arthropod remains were fossilized. These indicate a transition to more permanent lakes and broad floodplain conditions at the center of the Tambach Basin, rather than the ephemeral fluvial environment of the lower beds.

An extensive older sequence, the "Tambach-Wechsellagerung" (Tambach interbedding) was discovered in 2004 through borehole data. This sequence somewhat resembled the lower beds, with alternating fine micaceous deposits and thick sandstone sheets filled with a breccia of mudstone intraclasts. However, the sandstone layers had no evidence of cross-bedding, and the mud drapings responsible for most of the Tambach trace fossils were absent as well. Rare fragments of vertebrate fossils were present, along with calcite structures.

=== Age ===
Uranium-Lead dating is not possible for the Tambach Formation, which lacks fresh volcanic rocks. The similar Elgersburg Formation to the southeast contains rhyolite dated to 274 ± 4.9 million years ago. However, it is unclear whether the strata at Elgersburg are younger, older, or equivalent in age to the Tambach Formation. Biostratigraphy is more informative but still imprecise. Insect and conchostracan biostratigraphy places it into the Sakmarian-Artinskian Moravamylacris kukalovae and late Artinskian Lioestheria monticula/andreevi biozones, respectively. The only species of tetrapod known to exist in both the Tambach Formation and North American faunas is Seymouria sanjuanensis, which persisted for approximately 15 million years between the Asselian and the early Kungurian. Since the species of Dimetrodon present at Tambach is smaller than those present in the red beds of Texas, the Tambach Formation was likely older than those formations. The Tambach Formation was placed within the Seymouran LVF (Land Vertebrate Faunachron) of Lucas (2006), a biozone which was estimated to include the Artinskian-Kungurian boundary. Combining both invertebrate and tetrapod biostratigraphy, the age of the Tambach Formation was considered to be probably Artinskian in age. In a study published in 2022, Menning and colleagues consider the age of the Tambach formation to be probably between 294 and 292 Ma, corresponding to the Sakmarian. This estimate is based primarily on the radiometric age of 295.8 ± 0.4 Ma (late Asselian) of the Rotterode Formation which unconformably underlies the Tambach Formation, and on the estimate that the interval of geologic time not represented between the two formations is less than 2 million years. In addition, comparison of the footprint assemblage of the Tambach Formation with radiometrically dated Permian footprint assemblages from France and Italy also suggests a Sakmarian age.

== Climate ==
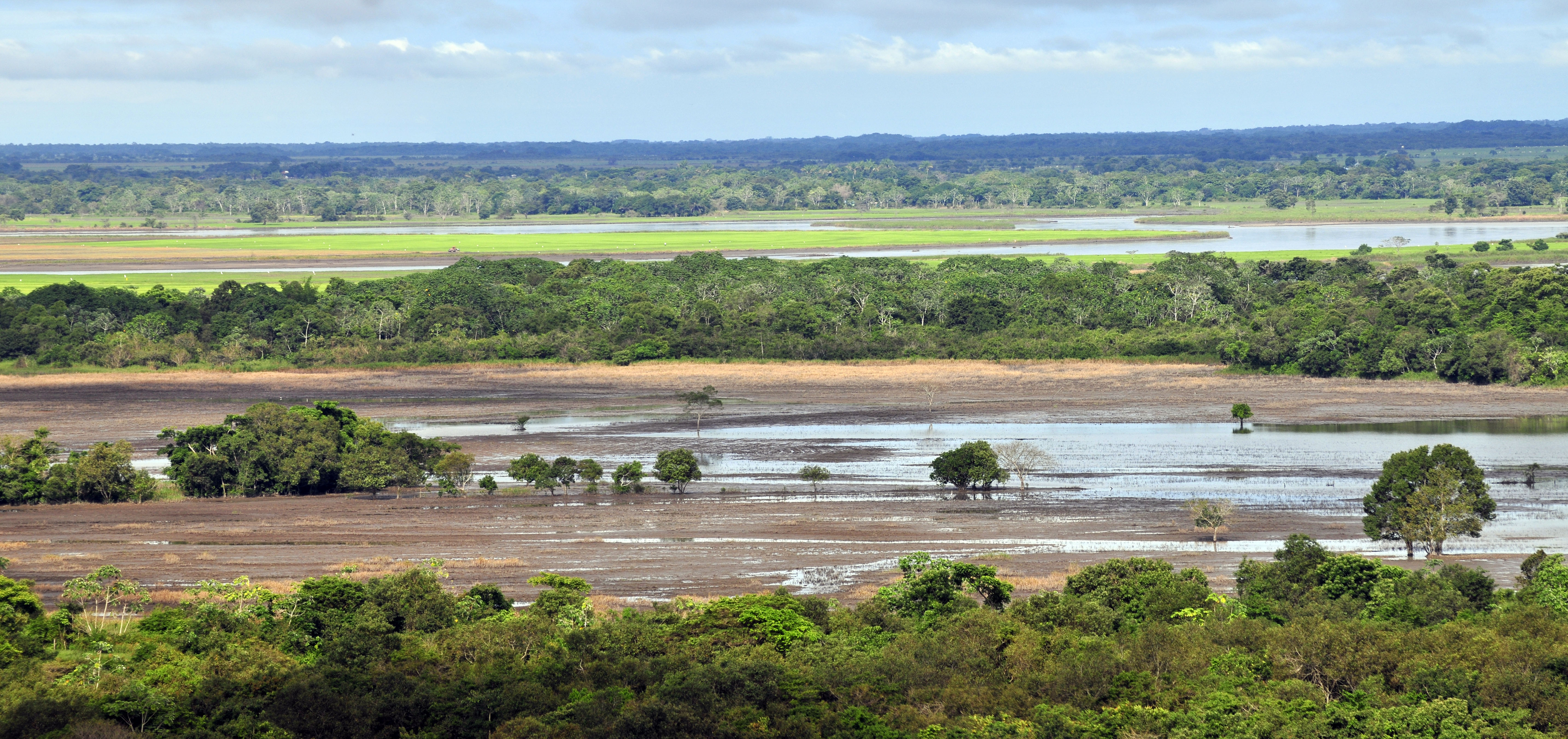
Los Llanos in present-day South America, which may have had a similar climate to the Tambach Formation.

The sand and silt-rich portions of the Tambach Formation were likely deposited in a warm climate with both hot, dry parts of the year and periodic heavy rainfall events. The dry times were severe enough to evaporate the Tambach basin's flood-induced ephemeral lakes within a matter of days, restricting the ability of a permanent aquatic fauna to colonize the basin. However, most plant root fossils are horizontally (rather than vertically) oriented, indicating that the climate was generally humid enough that native plants would not need to evolve deep roots or other xerophytic adaptations. Because of this, the Tambach Formation would probably fall under the modern tropical savanna climate, despite its lack of grass. Modern climatic equivalents include the northern African savanna and the Llanos of Venezuela and Colombia. However, from the sediment geochemistry of the Tambach Sandstone Member, Scholze and Pint proposed a mean annual temperature of only 10.9 to 15 °C (12.7 °C on average). There is evidence that sub-zero temperatures may have occurred on some nights during the dry season, likely as a result of the basin's high elevation. The climate may have been drier during the conglomerate-rich periods of the Tambach Formation.

== Paleobiota ==
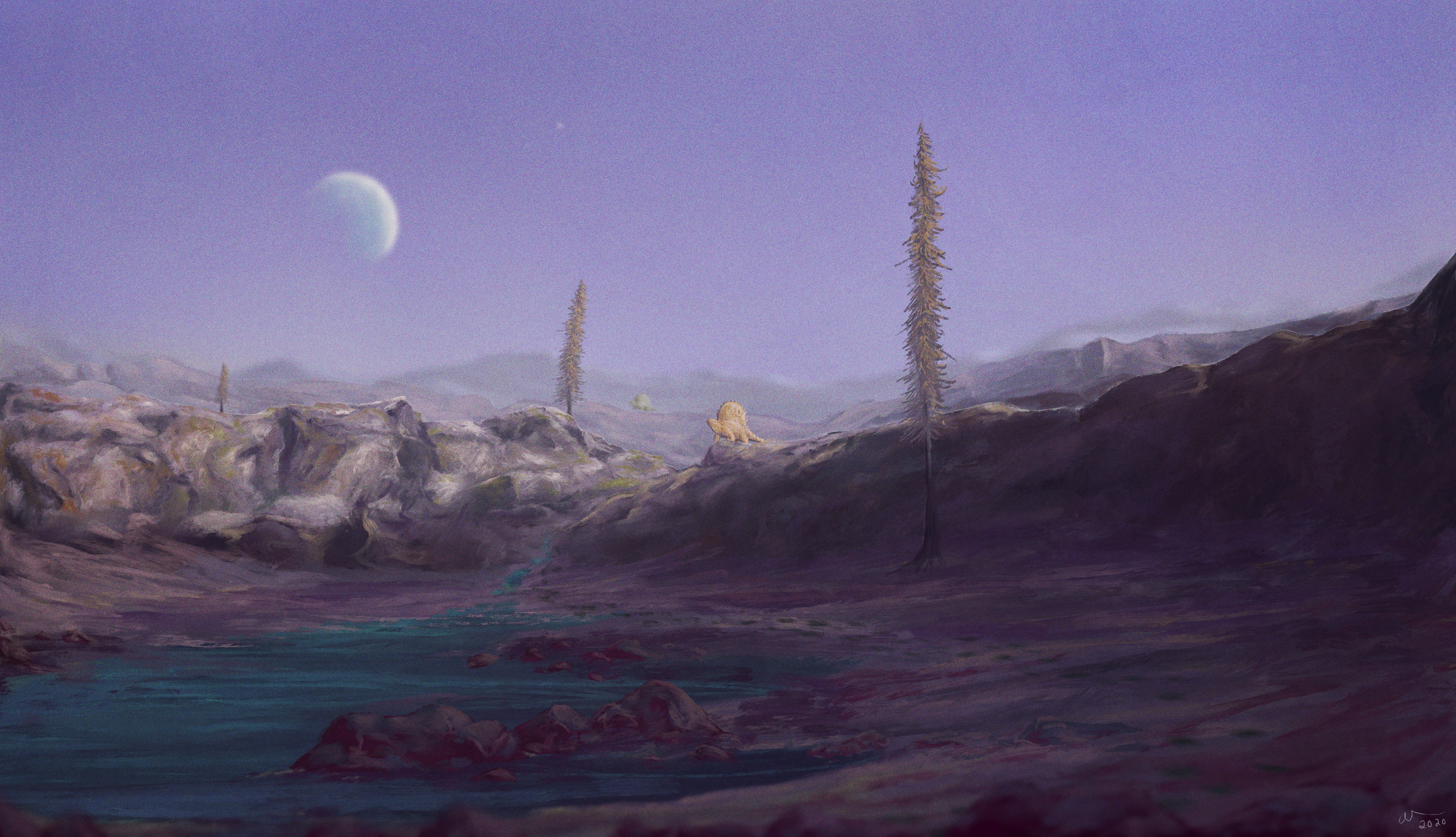
Artist's depiction of the Tambach paleoenvironment

The ecosystem of the Tambach Formation is unusual for its lack of aquatic animals such as xenacanthid sharks, Eryops, or Diplocaulus, which are otherwise common in Early Permian red beds. This is best explained by its mountainous environment, isolated from the monsoonal lowland floodplains which deposited most of the red beds. In addition, the ephemeral nature of the Tambach Basin's lakes and rivers means that only aquatic animals adapted to such conditions, such as conchostracans, were able to flourish. The Tambach Basin did support a diverse amphibian fauna, but only terrestrially-adapted types including dissorophoids and seymouriamorphs. Large herbivorous tetrapods such as caseids and especially diadectids are the most common body fossils recovered from the formation, while carnivorous synapsids are relatively rare. This is in contrast to North American environments, where fossils of carnivores such as Dimetrodon outnumber herbivore fossils. The environmental conditions of Tambach likely created a food web which was very different from that of the lowlands. The most common plants were tough, drought-adapted types such as conifers, while seed ferns and other lowland plants were much rarer. Fibrous terrestrial plants encouraged colonization of the basin by herbivorous land animals, but the dry climate prevents the development of an aquatic food chain, inhibiting animals such as large species of Dimetrodon, which get a large portion of their food from waterways.

The Tambach Formation preserves the oldest known terrestrial regurgitalite (fossilized vomit), in the form of a cluster of bones including material from Thuringothyris, Eudibamus, and diadectids. The regurgitalite was probably from a large predator such as Dimetrodon teutonis or Tambacarnifex.

Color key: Taxon / Reclassified taxon / Taxon falsely reported as present / Dubious taxon or junior synonym / Ichnotaxon / Ootaxon / Morphotaxon	Notes; Uncertain or tentative taxa are in small text; ~~crossed out~~ taxa are discredited.

=== Flora ===
Genus	Species	Member	Material	Notes	Images
Calamites	C. gigas	Tambach-Sandstein Member	Some specimens.	Horsetails.	
Callipteris	C. sp.	Tambach-Sandstein Member	Very rare.	A fern.	
Ernestiodendron	E. filiciforme	Tambach-Sandstein Member	Some specimens.	A conifer.	
Metacalamostachys	M. dumasii	Tambach-Sandstein Member	Some specimens.	Horsetails.	
Walchia	W. piniformis	Tambach-Sandstein Member	Some specimens.	A conifer.	

=== Invertebrates ===
Taxon	Member	Material	Notes	Images
cf. Anthracoblattina	Tambach-Sandstein Member	Some specimens.	A phylloblattid insect.	
Lioestheria andreevi	Tambach-Sandstein Member	Some specimens.	A conchostracan. Originally Lioestheria monticula, which was later considered a junior synonym of L. andreevi.	
Medusina limnica	Tambach-Sandstein Member	Many specimens.	A freshwater jellyfish.	
Moravamylacris kukalovae	Tambach-Sandstein Member	Some specimens.	A mylacrid insect.	
Opsiomylacris sp.	Tambach-Sandstein Member	Some specimens.	A mylacrid insect.	
Phylloblatta sp.	Tambach-Sandstein Member	Some specimens.	A phylloblattid insect.	
Scoyenia gracilis	Tambach-Sandstein Member	Numerous specimens.	Tiny burrow casts, possibly created by burrowing worms.	
Striatichnium bromackerense	Tambach-Sandstein Member	Numerous specimens.	Possibly feeding traces from underwater worms or arthropods raking along a substrate.	
Tambia spiralis	Tambach-Sandstein Member	Numerous specimens.	Small burrow casts with scratch marks, possibly created by large beetles or small burrowing reptiles (Thuringothyris).	

=== Basal Tetrapods ===
Genus	Species	Member	Material	Notes	Images
Amphisauropus	A. kablikae?	Tambach-Sandstein Member	Rare, heavily eroded specimens.	Footprints likely created by seymouriamorphs such as Seymouria sanjuanensis. Tambach specimens may be misinterpreted examples of other ichnotaxa.	
Bromerpeton	B. subcolossus		MNG 16545 (holotype), a partial skeleton with skull and forelimb material.	A brachystelechid microsaur.	
Diadectes	D. absitus	Tambach-Sandstein Member	MNG 8853 (holotype), MNG 7721, 8978 (paratypes).	A diadectid tetrapod. May be its own genus, Silvadectes.	
Diadectes	D. dreigleichenensis	Tambach-Sandstein Member	MNG 8747 (holotype), a skull with jaws.	A diadectid tetrapod.	
Georgenthalia	G. clavinasica	Tambach-Sandstein Member	MNG 11135 (holotype), a small but complete skull.	An amphibamiform dissorophoid temnospondyl.	
Ichniotherium	I. cottae	Tambach-Sandstein Member	Numerous specimens.	Footprints created by Diadectes absitus.	
Ichniotherium	I. sphaerodactylum	Tambach-Sandstein Member	Numerous specimens.	Footprints created by Orobates pabsti.	
Orobates	O. pabsti	Tambach-Sandstein Member	Four individuals are known from the specimens MNG 10181 (holotype), MNG 8760, 8980, 11133, 11134 (paratypes).	A diadectid tetrapod.	
Rotaryus	R. gothae	Tambach-Sandstein Member	MNG 10182 (holotype), articulated partial well-preserved skull and both mandibles and a closely associated partial postcranial skeleton.	A trematopid dissorophoid temnospondyl.	
Seymouria	S. sanjuanensis	Tambach-Sandstein Member	MNG 7727, 8759, 10553, 10554 (referred)	A seymouriid reptiliomorph.	
Tambachia	T. trogallas	Tambach-Sandstein Member	MNG 7722 (holotype), a crushed skull and much of the postcranial skeleton.	A trematopid dissorophoid temnospondyl.	
Tambaroter	T. carrolli	Finsterbergen conglomerate Member	MNG 14708 (holotype), an almost complete skull.	An ostodolepid microsaur.	

=== Reptiles ===
Taxon	Member	Material	Notes	Images
Eudibamus	Tambach-Sandstein Member	MNG 8852 (holotype), an almost complete cranial and postcranial skeleton.	A bolosaurid parareptile.	
Thuringothyris	Tambach-Sandstein Member	At least eight individuals are known from the specimens MNG 7729 (holotype), MNG 10183, 10647, 10652, 11191 (referred).	The basalmost known captorhinid eureptile.	

=== Synapsids ===
Genus	Species	Member	Material	Notes	Images
Bromackerichnus	B. requiescens	Tambach-Sandstein Member		Body impressions created by non-therapsid synapsids ("pelycosaurs") such as sphenacodontids.	
Dimetrodon	D. teutonis	Tambach-Sandstein Member	MNG 10598 (holotype), partial vertebral column. The referred specimens MNG 10654, 10655, 10693 represent much of the postcranial skeleton. The referred specimen MNG 13433 represents a right maxilla.	A sphenacodontid.	
Dimetropus	D. leisnerianus	Tambach-Sandstein Member	Some specimens.	Footprints created by non-therapsid synapsids ("pelycosaurs") such as sphenacodontids.	
Martensius	M. bromackerensis	Tambach-Sandstein Member	Four articulated specimens.	A caseid	
Tambacarnifex	T. unguifalcatus	Tambach-Sandstein Member	MNG 10596 (holotype), partial skeleton. MNG 15037, partial left dentary.	A varanopid.	

=== Tetrapoda indet. ===
Taxon	Member	Material	Notes	Images
Megatambichnus sp.	Tambach-Sandstein Member	Some specimens.	Large burrows and scratch marks, likely created by diadectids.	
Tambachichnium schmidti	Tambach-Sandstein Member	Some specimens.	Footprints which may have been created by procolophonomorphs, araeoscelidians, or varanopids.	
Varanopus microdactylus	Tambach-Sandstein Member	Some specimens.	Originally Ichnium microdactylum. Footprints which may have been created by captorhinomorphs (Thuringothyris), varanopids, or Seymouria sanjuanensis.	
