= Aaskouandy =

Iroquois charm

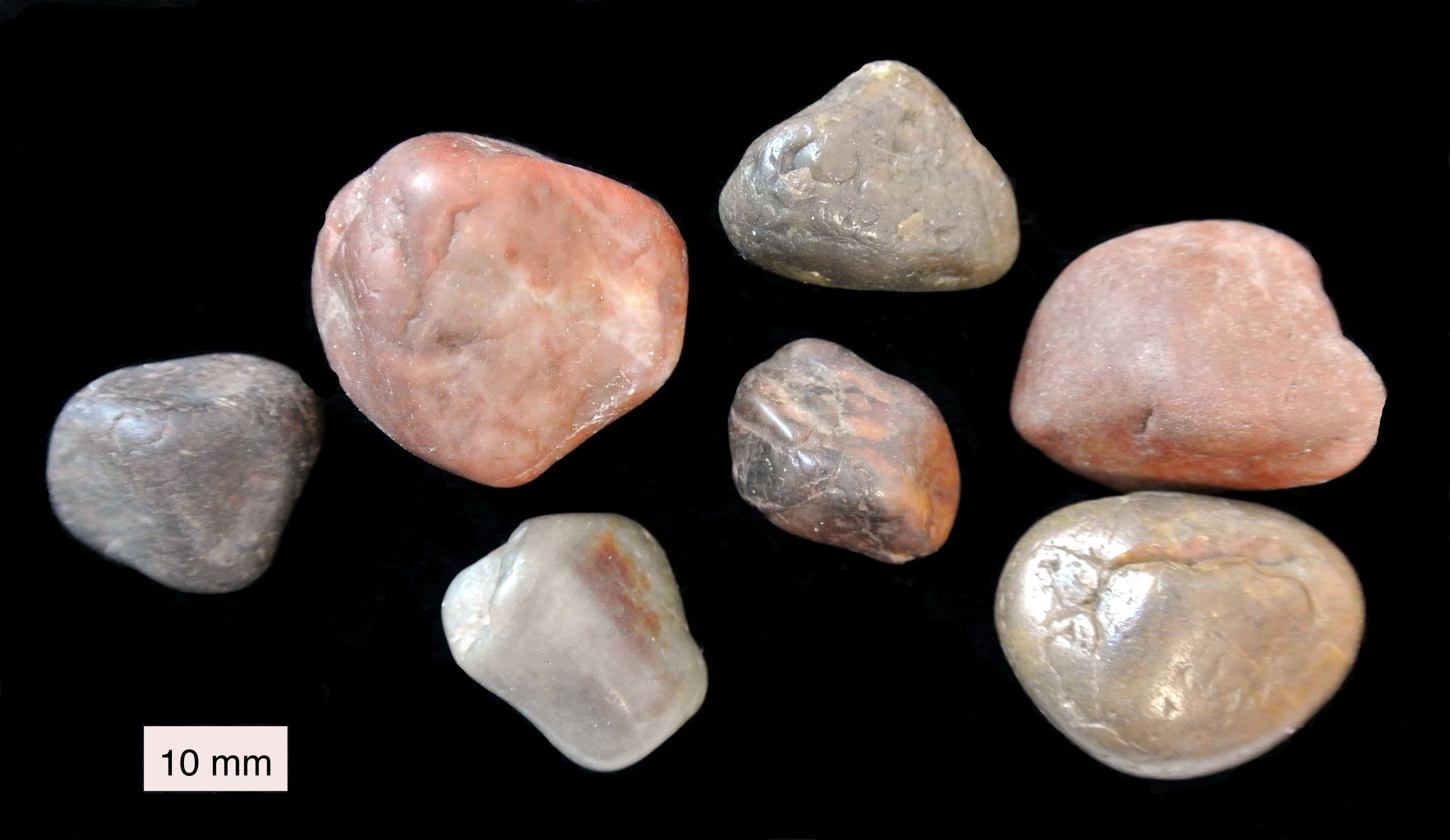
Gastroliths (Gizzard Stones) in various shapes and sizes

An aaskouandy (also aask8andik, asckwandies, askwandics, aaskwandiks, and aaskuandi) is a charm (Note: Cayuga: otsinǫ̱hgę́ˀdaˀ; Seneca: otšínöhgë́’da’) which in Haudenosaunee folklore is believed to either grant the holder luck in sports, hunting, fishing, and trade, luck in general, or even harm the holder.

In folklore traditions, an object or serpent found within the body of an animal which has eluded a hunter for some time or some other unusual place is what is believed to be the aakskouandy. What exactly the aaskouandy does must be revealed to its owner in a dream. Because of the dangers associated with the charm, its owner is required to maintain a good relationship with the object by providing offerings and care. If such care is neglected, it is believed to turn to humans for food. Commonly, aaskouandy charms are found from gizzard stones.

Some believe that if the aaskouandy found is in the shape of a fish or a serpent it is seen as extra potent and becomes an onniont. However, an Onnoint is actually a creature from which a different sort of charm may be obtained.
