= Christopher Whittle =

Christopher Whittle may refer to:

- Christopher H. Whittle, educator, paleontologist, artist, and explorer
- Chris Whittle, American entrepreneur, best known for founding Edison Schools, Inc.
