= Triumph (koala) =

External Video
- The dentist who helped a koala to walk (2:38), February 21, 2021, BBC

Triumph is a name that was given to a koala who was born without a hindlimb and was rescued in 2017 by a veterinary nurse Marley Christian in northern New South Wales, Australia. Triumph is known to be the first koala to receive a limb prosthesis in the world. The prosthetic leg was created by Jon Doulman and the koala now uses the prosthetic to climb and groom himself.
