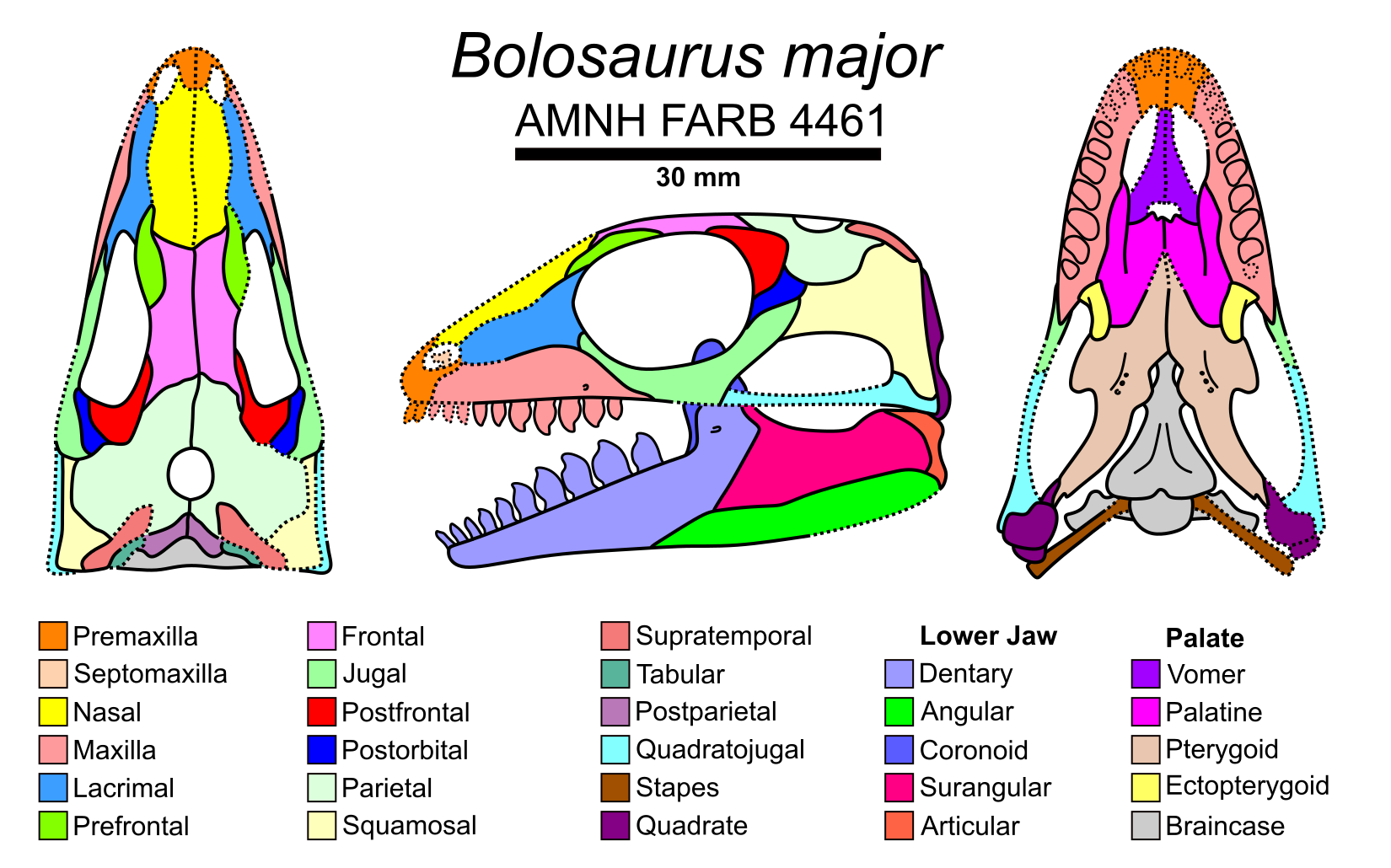
- Skull diagram of Bolosaurus major

Scientific classification
- Kingdom: Animalia
- Phylum: Chordata
- Family: †Bolosauridae
- Genus: †Bolosaurus; Cope, 1878

Species
- †B. striatus Cope, 1878 (type); †B. major Broom, 1913; †B. traati Tatarinov, 1974; †B. grandis Reisz et al., 2002

= Bolosaurus =

Bolosaurus Temporal range: Early Permian, 289.5–273.6 Ma

Extinct genus of reptiles

Bolosaurus (from Ancient Greek bolos, "lump" + sauros: lizard]) is an extinct genus of bolosaurid reptile from the Cisuralian epoch (middle Sakmarian to early Kungurian stages) of North Asia and North America (Red Beds of Texas and Oklahoma).

== Geological and environmental information ==
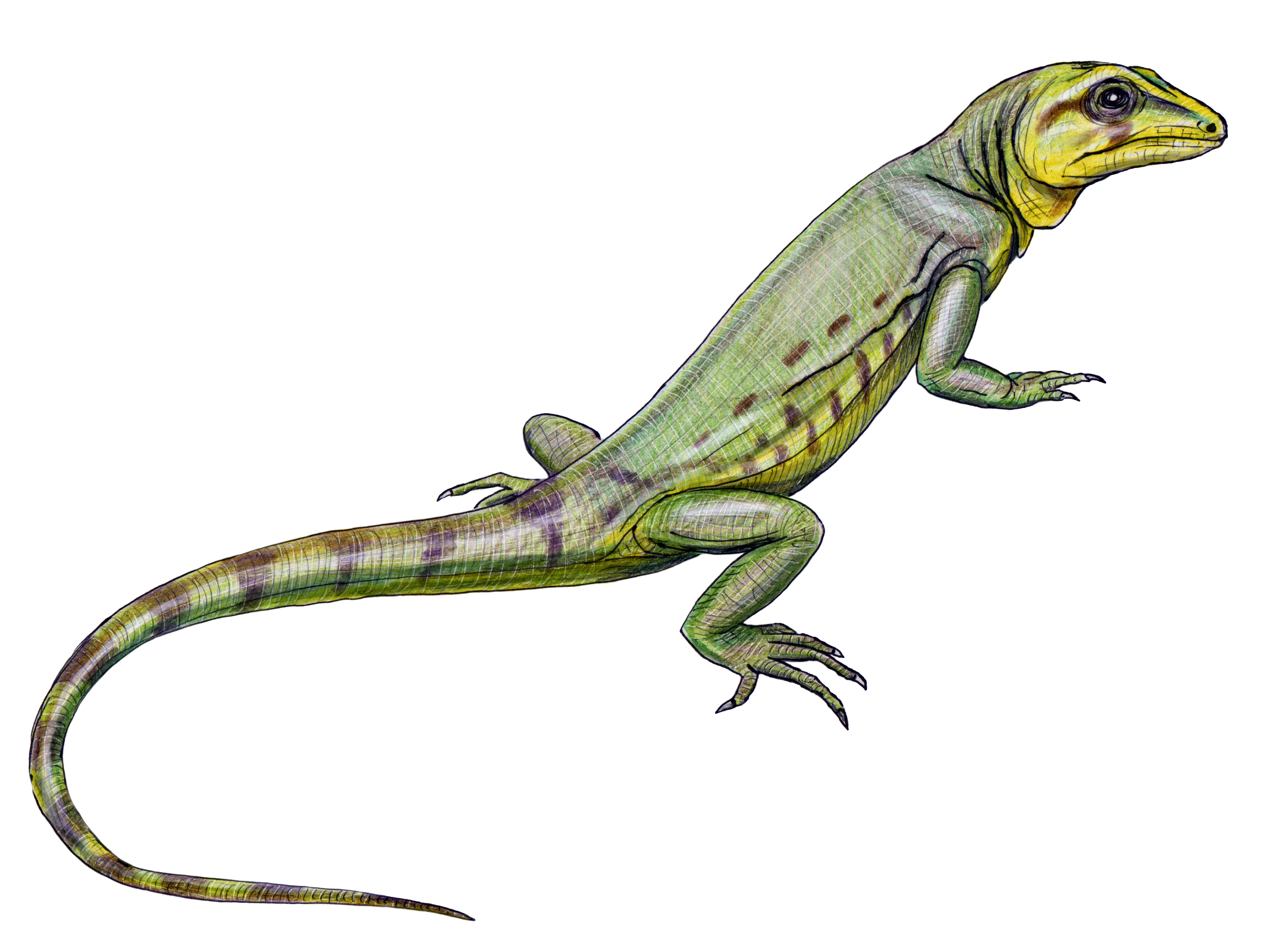
Life reconstruction of Bolosaurus striatus

The Permian period is characterized by the presence of a single supercontinent called Pangea. Pangaea stretched from pole to pole, and thus created a single great ocean called Panthalassa, and the Paleo-Tethys Ocean, which was located between Asia and Gondwana. The single gigantic continental landmass created extreme climates, which are characterized by extreme variations of heat and cold, as well as highly seasonal monsoon conditions in some parts of the supercontinent. Not all regions received abundant rainfalls, and deserts were widespread on Pangaea. Such climate patterns favored gymnosperms over plants that use spore dispersion.

== Historical information / discovery ==
The first Bolosaurus was described by Edward Drinker Cope in 1878. His article "Descriptions of Extinct Batrachia and Reptilia from the Permian Formation of Texas" mentioned the findings of crushed skull and few vertebrae of Bolosaurus striatus and Bolosaurus rapidens (Cope 1878). The imperfect skull of Bolosaurus major was found by Robert Broom in 1911 and was published in his article "On the structure and Affinities of Bolosaurus" in 1913 (Broom, 1913), however it was only described in detail over 100 years later. In 1974 a bolosaurid maxilla was found by Tartarinov in Mylva River, Komi, Russia and was named Bolosaurus traati (Tartarinov 1974). The most recent Bolosaurus species to have been discovered was by Robert R. Reisz, who found the jawbones of Bolosaurus grandis and published it in 2002 (Reisz 2002).

== Description and paleobiology ==
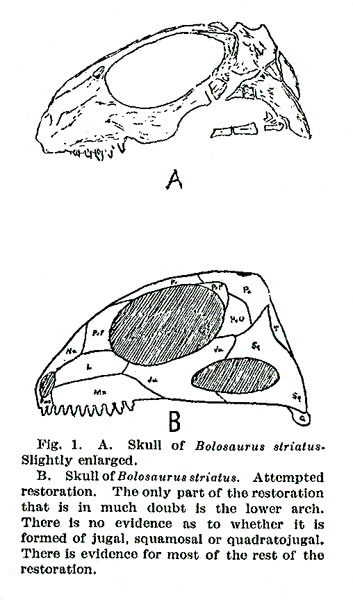
Old reconstruction of the skull of Bolosaurus

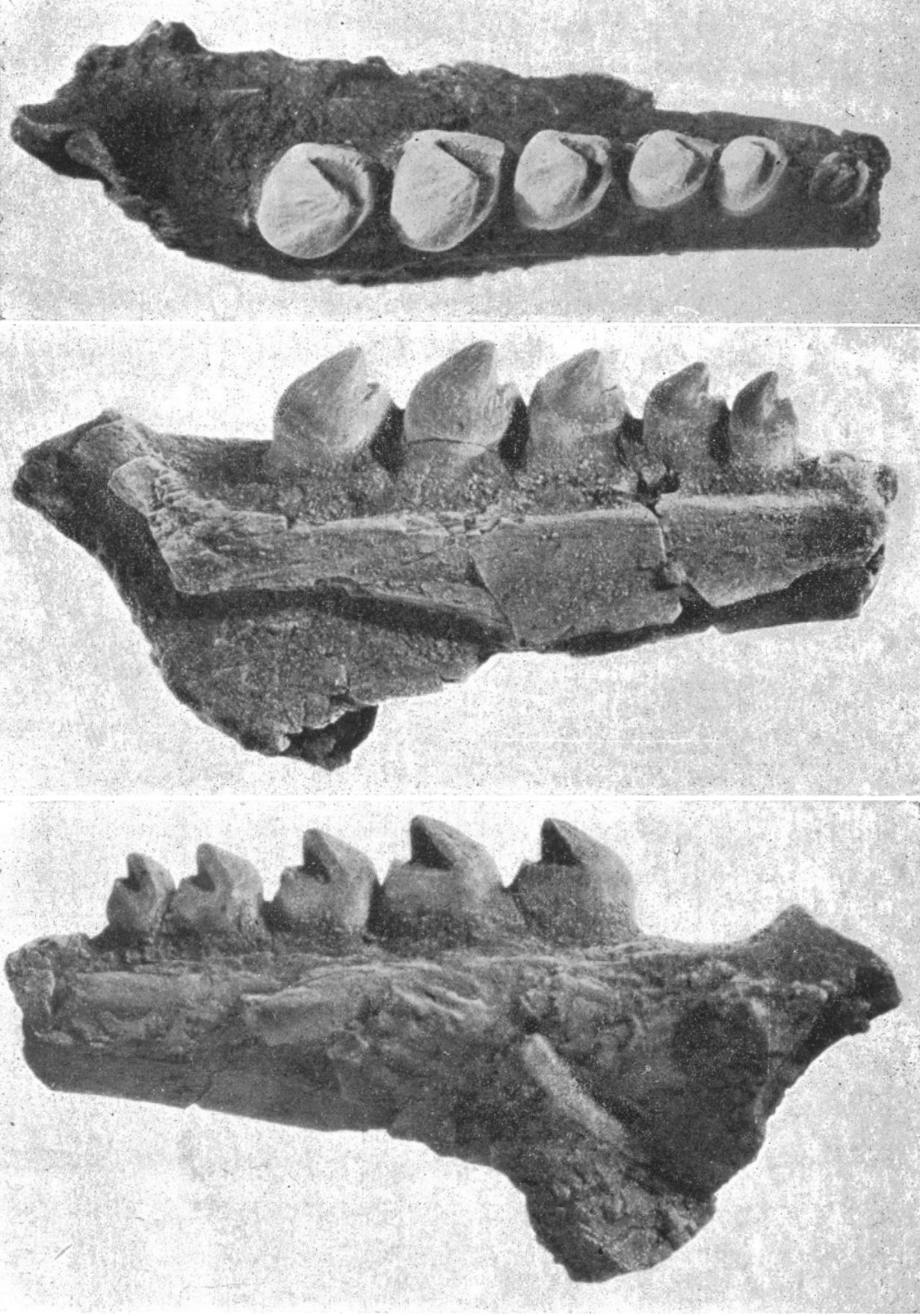
jaw fragment with posterior molariform teeth

Skull: The skulls of Bolosaurus are basically triangular in form. The skull is wider and higher in the posterior region, while the anterior snout terminates bluntly. The orbits are large and circular in outline. Teeth: Tooth planted in shallow cavity with its crowns expanded transversely to the jaw axis. In the upper jaw, the posterior internal half of the maxillary series is low and horizontal, forming a ledge. The anterior external part forms into a cusp. The teeth of the lower jaw are different from those of the upper jaw via reversed position of ledge and cusp. This pattern suggests that Bolosaurus was herbivorous in diet (Cope, 1878). The best preserved specimen showed a total of 16 teeth (Case 1907).

In 2024, a detailed anatomical study was published of Bolosaurus major which showed that this animal had a partial secondary palate, which may have allowed it to bite very hard. A similar structure is seen in the bolosaurid Belebey vegrandis
