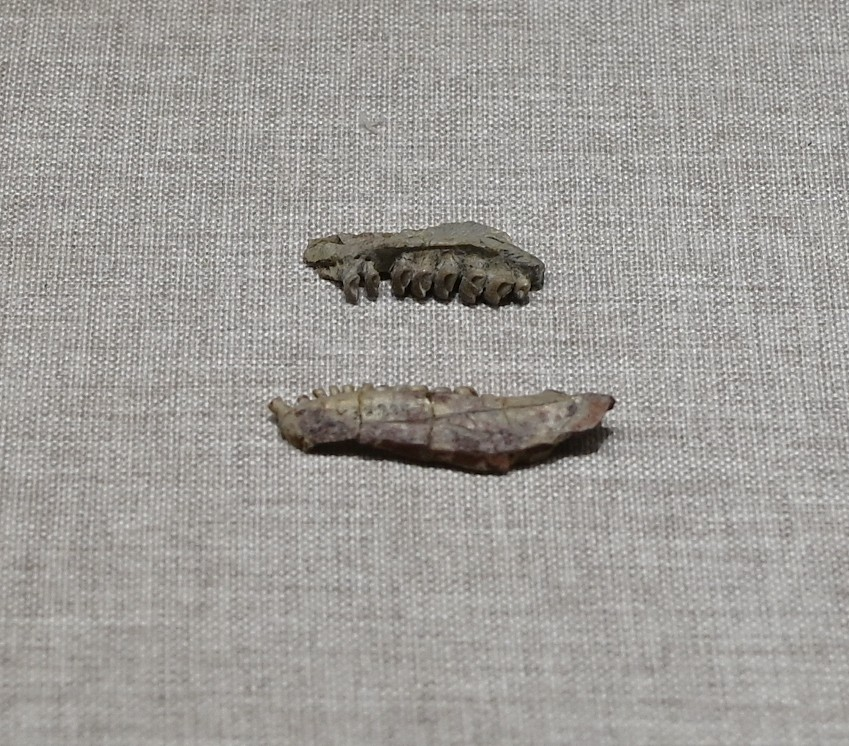
- Holotype maxilla (top, IVPP IG CAGS V331) and paratype dentary (bottom, IVPP V12007) of B. chengi

Scientific classification
- Kingdom: Animalia
- Phylum: Chordata
- Family: †Bolosauridae
- Genus: †Belebey; Ivakhnenko, 1973

Species
- †B. vegrandis Ivakhnenko, 1973 (type); †B. maximi Tverdokhlebova, 1987; †B. chengi Müller, Li & Reisz, 2008; †B. augustodunensis Falconnet, 2012; †B. shumovi Bulanov et al., 2022

= Belebey (reptile) =

Belebey Temporal range: Permian, 296–265 Ma

Extinct genus of reptiles

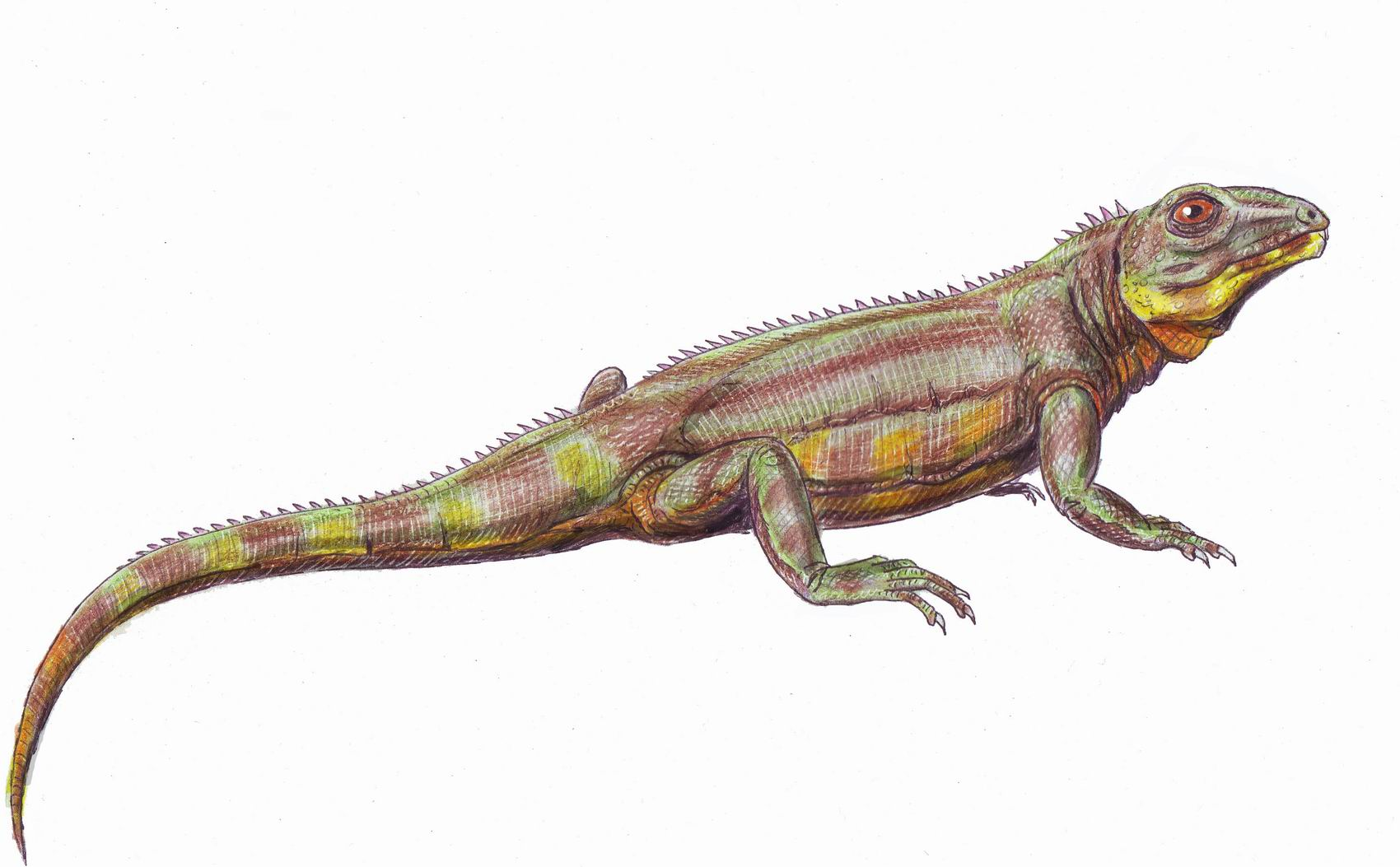
Life restoration of B. vegrandis

Belebey is an extinct genus of bolosaurid reptile containing species known from the latest Carboniferous (Gzhelian) or earliest Permian (Asselian) to Guadalupian (Middle Permian) stage of Europe (Russia, France) and Asia (China, Qingtoushan Formation).
