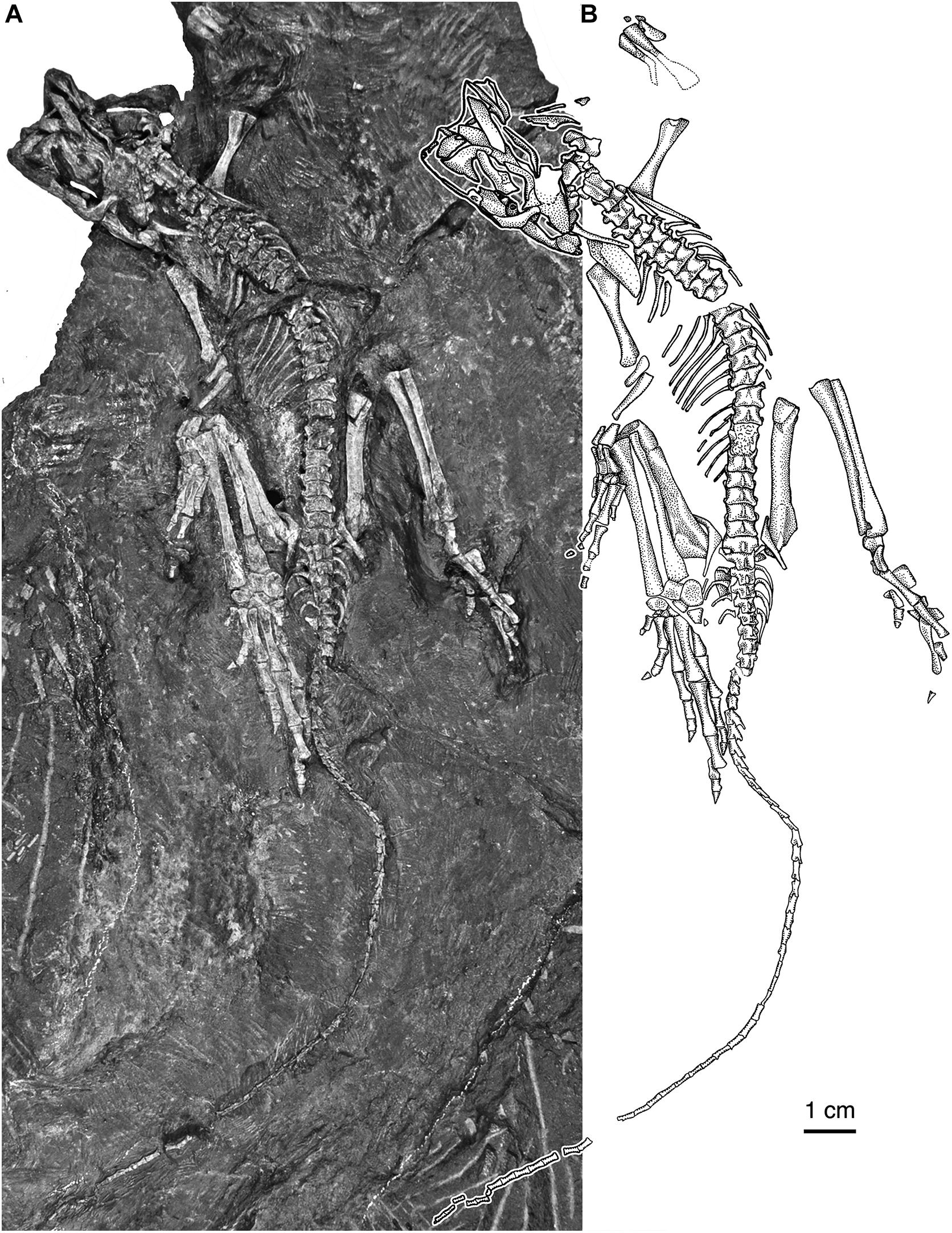
- Skeleton of Eudibamus

Scientific classification
- Kingdom: Animalia
- Phylum: Chordata
- Clade: Amniota
- Clade: Sauropsida
- Family: †Bolosauridae; Cope, 1878

Genera
- Eudibamus; Bolosaurus; Belebey; Permotriturus?

= Bolosauridae =

Bolosauridae Temporal range: Latest Carboniferous or earliest Permian to Middle Permian, 298.9–268 Ma

Extinct family of reptiles

Bolosauridae is an extinct family of herbivorous, lizard-like stem-reptiles known from the latest Carboniferous (Gzhelian) or earliest Permian (Asselian) to the early Guadalupian epoch (latest Roadian stage) of North America, China, Germany, Russia and France.

== Description ==
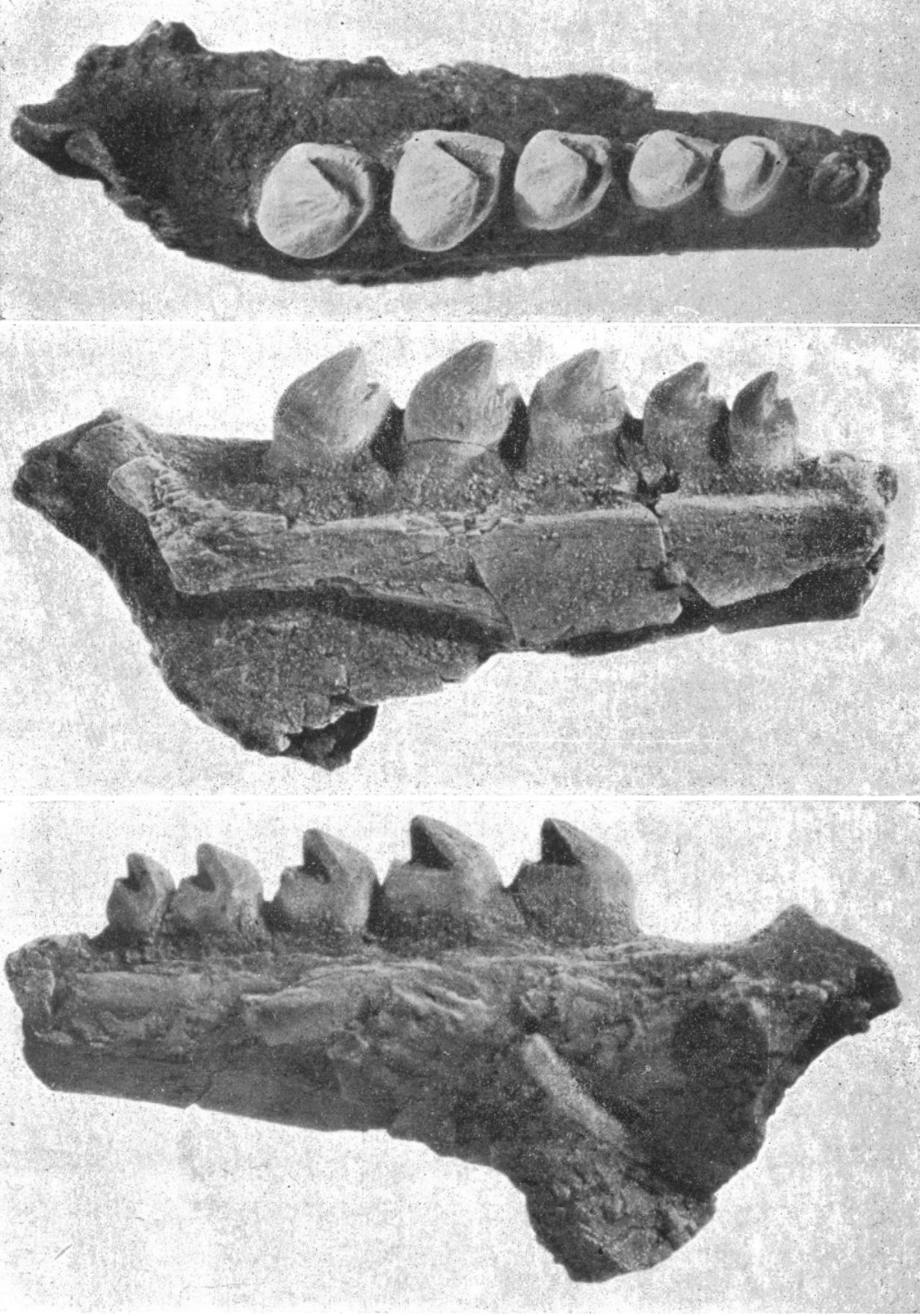
Jaw fragment with posterior molariform teeth of Bolosaurus in several views

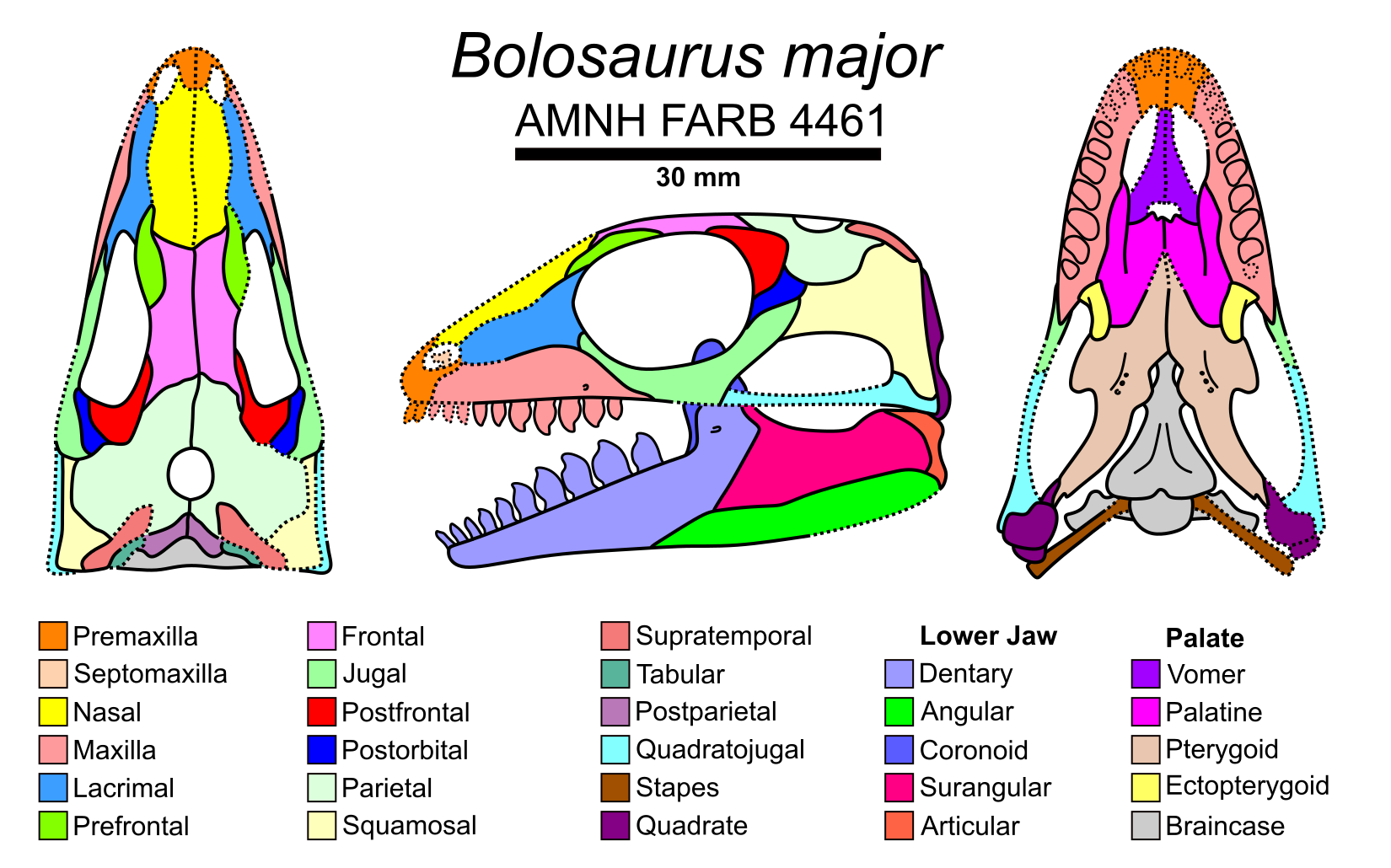
Skull diagram of Bolosaurus major, showing the skull from above (left) from the side (middle) and from below (right)

Bolosaurids were small and superficially lizard-like. They are united by a number of morphological features including the palatal teeth on the roof of the mouth being highly reduced or entirely absent, a reduced transverse flange on the pterygoid bone of the skull that lies at the same level as the palate, and the alveolar shelf on the lower jaw is expanded downwards (ventrally) such that it almost reaches the bottom of the mandible, with this extension largely covered by a forward (anterior) extension of the prearticular bone. They are also noted for their distinct heterodont teeth, with the front teeth having a pointed incisiform-like morphology, while the back teeth are molar-like, with rounded cusps, suggesting that bolosaurids were herbivores, likely consuming high-fiber vegetation, which was likely extensively processed in the mouth prior to swallowing. These teeth had a thecodont (or anklyothecodont) style of implantation with deep roots, which underwent synchronised replacement. The molariform teeth, at least in Belebey show the deposition of tertiary dentine as response to wear, unlike most reptiles but similar to mammalian teeth, which likely served to enhance their longevity to compensate for their highly abrasive diet.

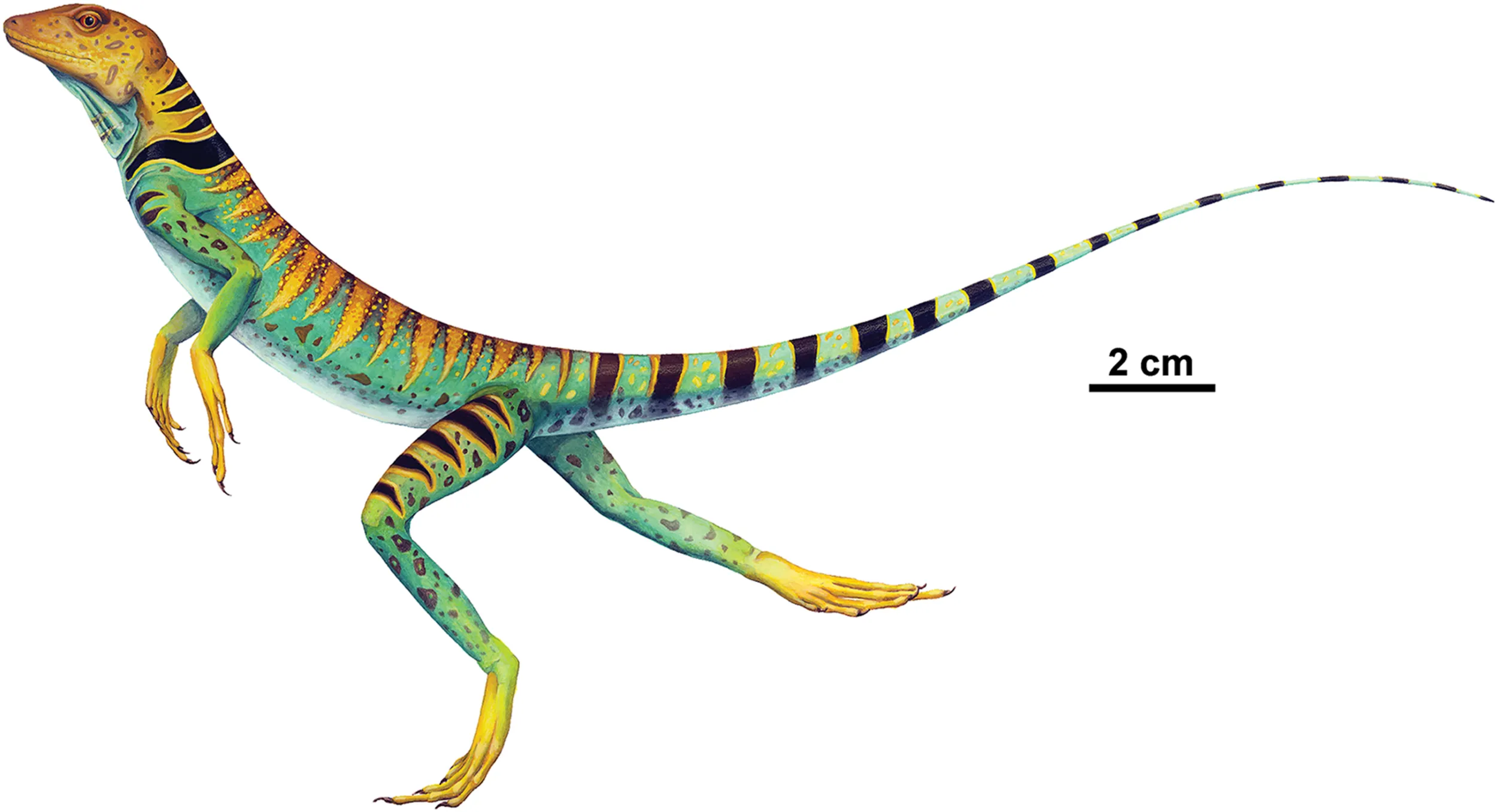
Restoration of the bolosaurid Eudibamus cursoris in bipedal running pose

The postcrania of most bolosaurids is poorly known, though the narrow trunk, elongate limb bones, especially of the hindlimb, and elongate tail of Eudibamus suggests that it was facultatively bipedal and capable of running quickly on four limbs as well as just its hind legs. Preserved impressions from the Asselian of Germany attributed to bolosaurs (possibly Eudibamus) suggest their bodies were covered in epidermal scales, similar to modern reptiles, which represent the oldest evidence of reptile scales as of 2026. The impressions suggest the scales were small and tightly packed.

== Taxonomy ==
Three genera of bolosaurid are currently recognised, Eudibamus, which only contains the type species E. cursoris, Bolosaurus with two species, and Belebey with five species, though not all of these species may be valid.

The following cladogram shows the phylogenetic relationships within Bolosauridae, after Johannes Müller, Jin-Ling Li and Robert R. Reisz, 2008.

- Bolosauridae
  - Eudibamus cursoris
  - - Bolosaurus
      - Bolosaurus grandis
      - Bolosaurus striatus
    - Belebey
      - Belebey chengi
      - Belebey maximi
      - Belebey vegrandis

Davletkulia gigantea, initially described as a bolosaurid, was later reinterpreted as a tapinocephaloid dinocephalian.

Bolosaurids are traditionally considered "parareptiles", a large, historically thought to be a monophyletic clade also including other groups of primitive, largely Carboniferous-Permian reptiles, such as the mesosaurs, pareiasaurs, acleistorhinids, millerettids and procolophonoids. However, the monophyly of "Parareptilia" has subsequently come into question. Jenkins et al. 2025: suggested the Bolosauridae are instead a family of basal sauropsids outside of Neoreptilia. Bolosauridae has also sometimes been considered part of the broader group "Bolosauria" alongside Erpetonyx from the Late Carboniferous of Canada, which is suggested to have been carnivorous rather than herbivorous like the bolosaurids. However, other studies have suggested that Erpetonyx is unrelated to bolosaurids.

Cladogram of Sauropsida (largely equivalent to Reptilia) after Jenkins et al. 2025, with parareptiles highlighted in orange:

- Sauropsida
  - †Araeoscelidia
  - - †Bolosauridae
    - - †Erpetonyx
      - Neoreptilia
        - †Ankyramorpha
          - †Acleistorhinidae
          - Procolophonia
            - †Pareiasauromorpha
            - †Procolophonoidea
        - - †Mesosauridae
          - - - †Cabarzia
              - - †Ascendonanus
                - †Orovenator
            - Parapleurota
              - †Millerettidae
              - Neodiapsida
                - †Younginidae
                - - †Tangasauridae
                  - - †Weigeltisauridae
                    - - †Claudiosaurus
                      - Sauria
                        - Lepidosauromorpha
                        - Archosauromorpha
