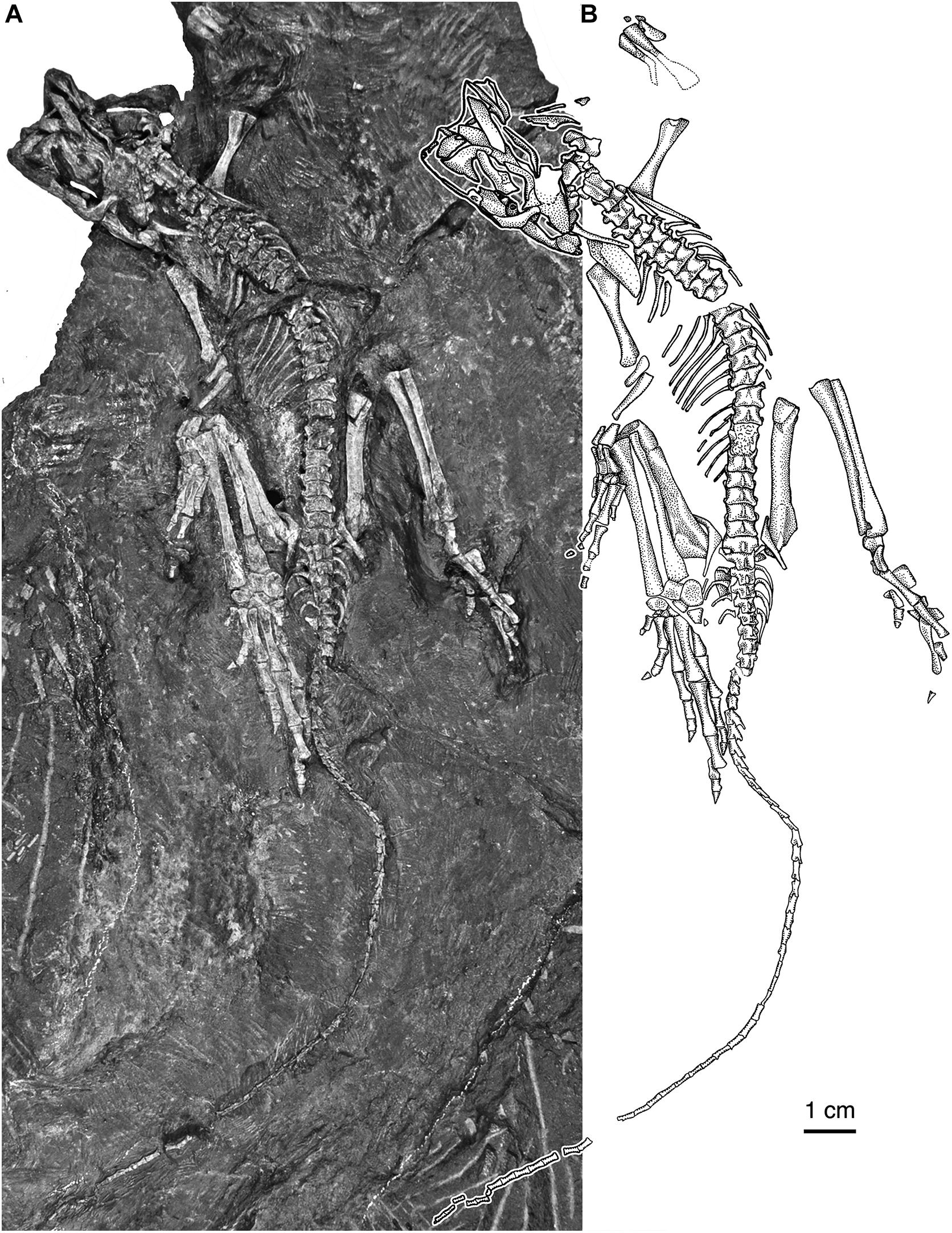
- Photo and illustration of the Eudibamus holotype skeleton

Scientific classification
- Kingdom: Animalia
- Phylum: Chordata
- Family: †Bolosauridae
- Genus: †Eudibamus; Berman et al., 2000

Type species
- †Eudibamus cursoris Berman et al., 2000

= Eudibamus =

Eudibamus Temporal range: Early Permian, 284–279.5 Ma

Extinct genus of reptiles

Eudibamus is an extinct genus of bolosaurid reptile known from the Early Permian of the Free State of Thuringia in central Germany. It was a small reptile, only 25-26 cm in length. Like other bolosaurids, it was probably an agile herbivore, and it shows a long list of adaptations for bipedal (two-legged) movement. The hindlimbs had a parasagittal stance, with close-set and nearly vertical legs similar to dinosaurs and mammals. The tail and hindlimbs are very long, the forelimbs are slender, the digits are closely bundled together, and the ankle joint is hinge-like. Eudibamus is regarded as the oldest known bipedal vertebrate.

== Discovery and etymology ==
Eudibamus was originally only known from the holotype MNG 8852, an articulated and almost complete cranial and postcranial skeleton. It was collected from the uppermost part of the Tambach Formation, dating to the Artinskian stage of the Late Cisuralian Series (or alternatively upper Rotliegend), about 284–279.5 million years ago. It was found in the Bromacker Quarry, the middle part of the Thuringian Forest, near the village of Tambach-Dietharz.

Eudibamus was named by David S. Berman, Robert R. Reisz, Diane Scott, Amy C. Henrici, Stuart S. Sumida and Thomas Martens in 2000 and the type species is Eudibamus cursoris. The generic name means 'typical two-footed' (from Greek eu-di-bāmos, based on bainō ‘to go’). The specific name is derived from the Latin cursor, or 'runner'. In 2021, the species was redescribed based on the holotype as well as a new referred specimen MNG 12895, comprising a hindlimb and part of the vertebral column.

== Description ==
The skull of the holotype specimen is crushed and only incompletely preserved. Like other bolosaurids, it had incisor like front-teeth and molar-like posterior teeth. The trunk ribs are relatively thin and short, indicating the trunk was narrow in life. The forelimb is significantly elongated relative to contemporary reptiles. The hindlimb is very greatly elongated, and significantly longer than the already elongate forelimbs. The tail is also elongate, making up approximately 63.4% the total length of the vertebral column.

== Palaeobiology ==
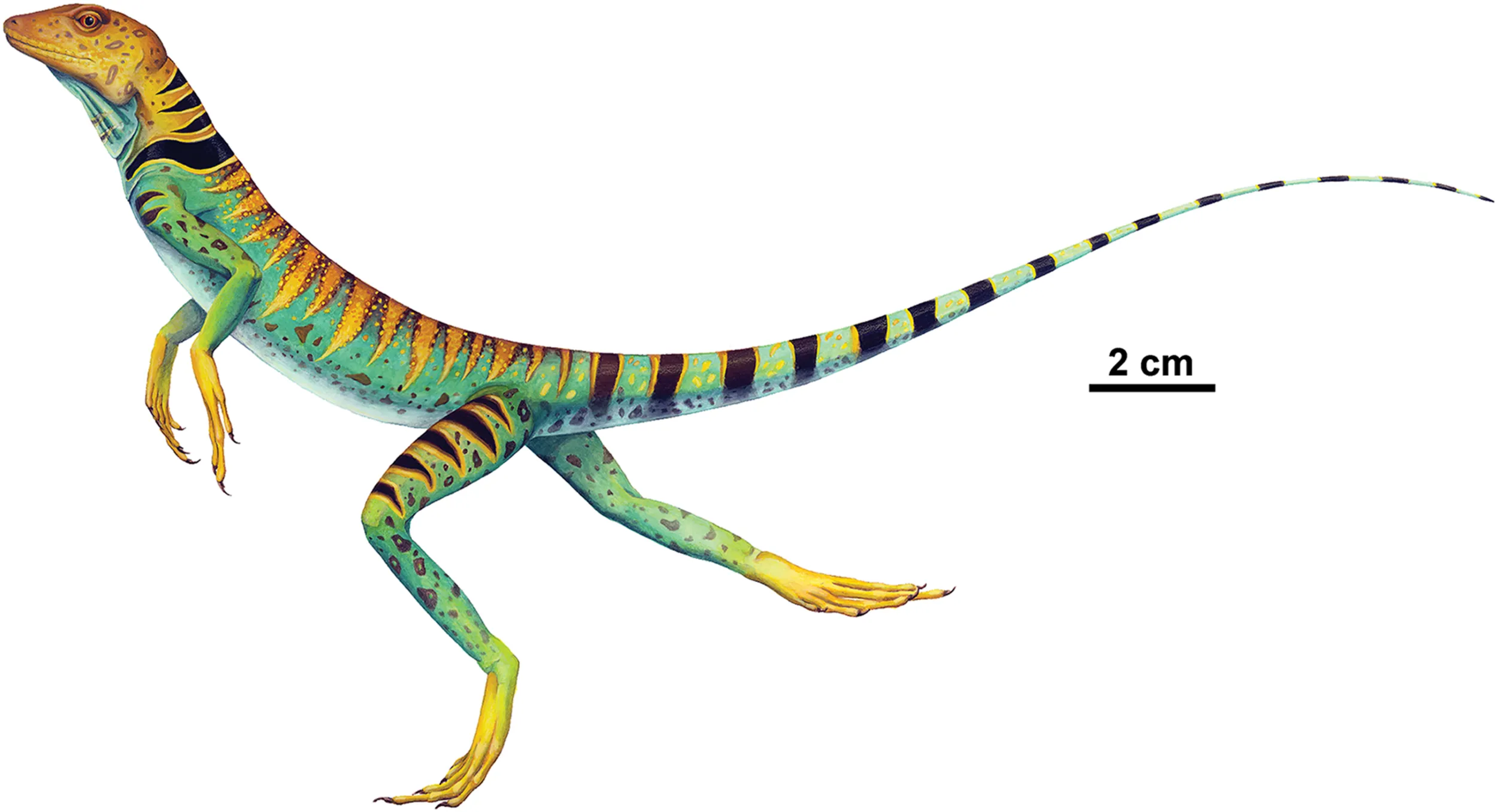
Life restoration of Eudibamus cursoris in running pose

Like other bolosaurids, Eudibamus is thought to have been herbivorous. Due to its very elongate hind limbs, among other anatomical features, Eudibamus has been widely posited to be facultatively bipedal, able to run quickly on hind limbs when necessary, though it was likely also capable of moving quickly on four limbs. It likely held its limbs beneath the body when running, swinging like a pendulum. Coprolitic evidence indicates that E. cursoris fell prey to Dimetrodon teutonis or Tambacarnifex unguifalcatus.
