= Gastrolith =

Rock held inside the intestinal tract

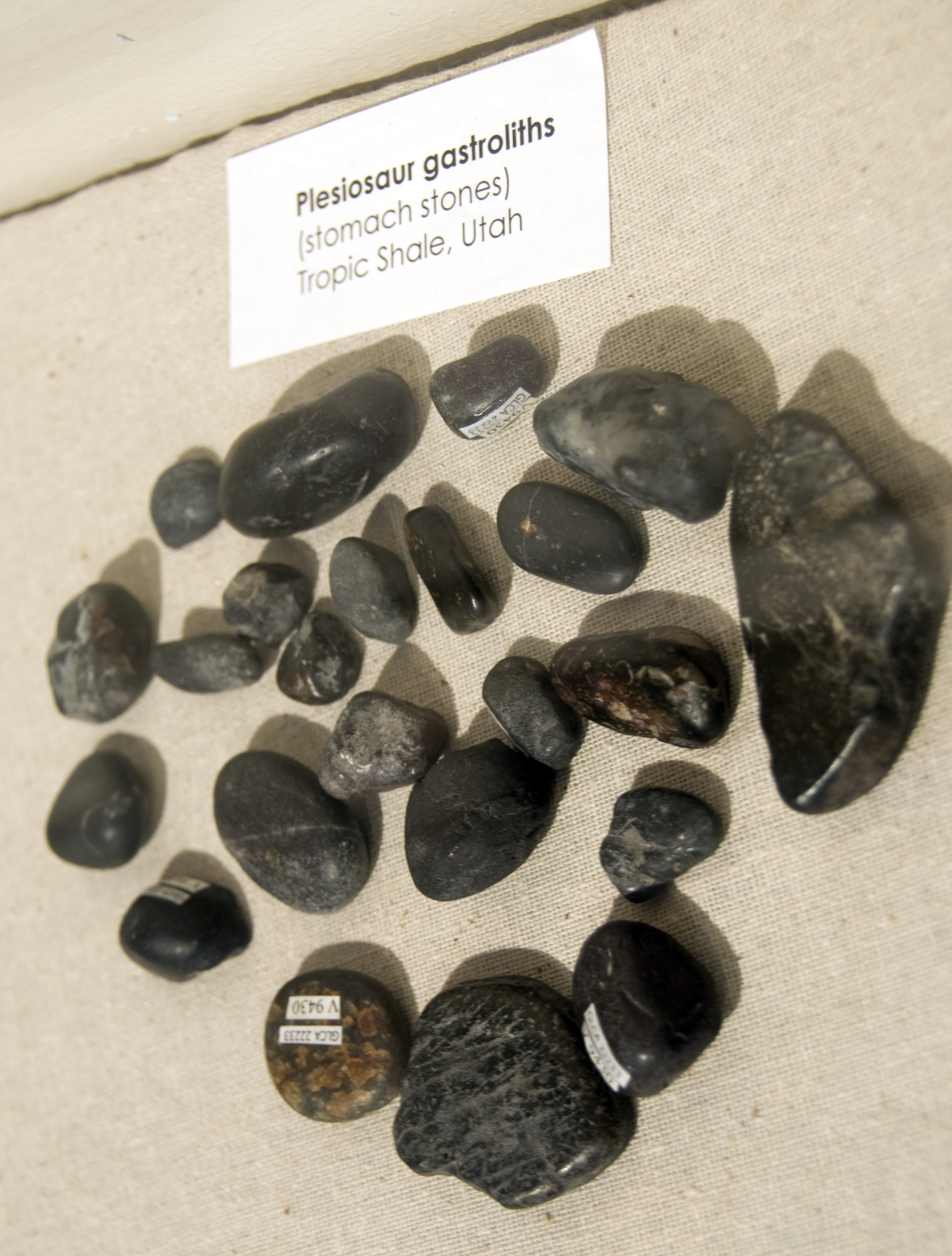
Plesiosaur gastroliths from Tropic Shale

A gastrolith, also called a stomach stone or gizzard stone, is a rock held inside a gastrointestinal tract. Gastroliths in some species are retained in the muscular gizzard and used to grind food in animals lacking suitable grinding teeth. In other species the rocks are ingested and pass through the digestive system and are frequently replaced. The grain size depends upon the size of the animal and the gastrolith's role in digestion. Other species use gastroliths as ballast. Particles ranging in size from sand to cobble have been documented. The ingestion of gastroliths is known as lithophagy.

== Etymology ==
Gastrolith comes from the Ancient Greek γαστήρ (gastēr), meaning "stomach", and λίθος (lithos), meaning "stone".

== Occurrence ==
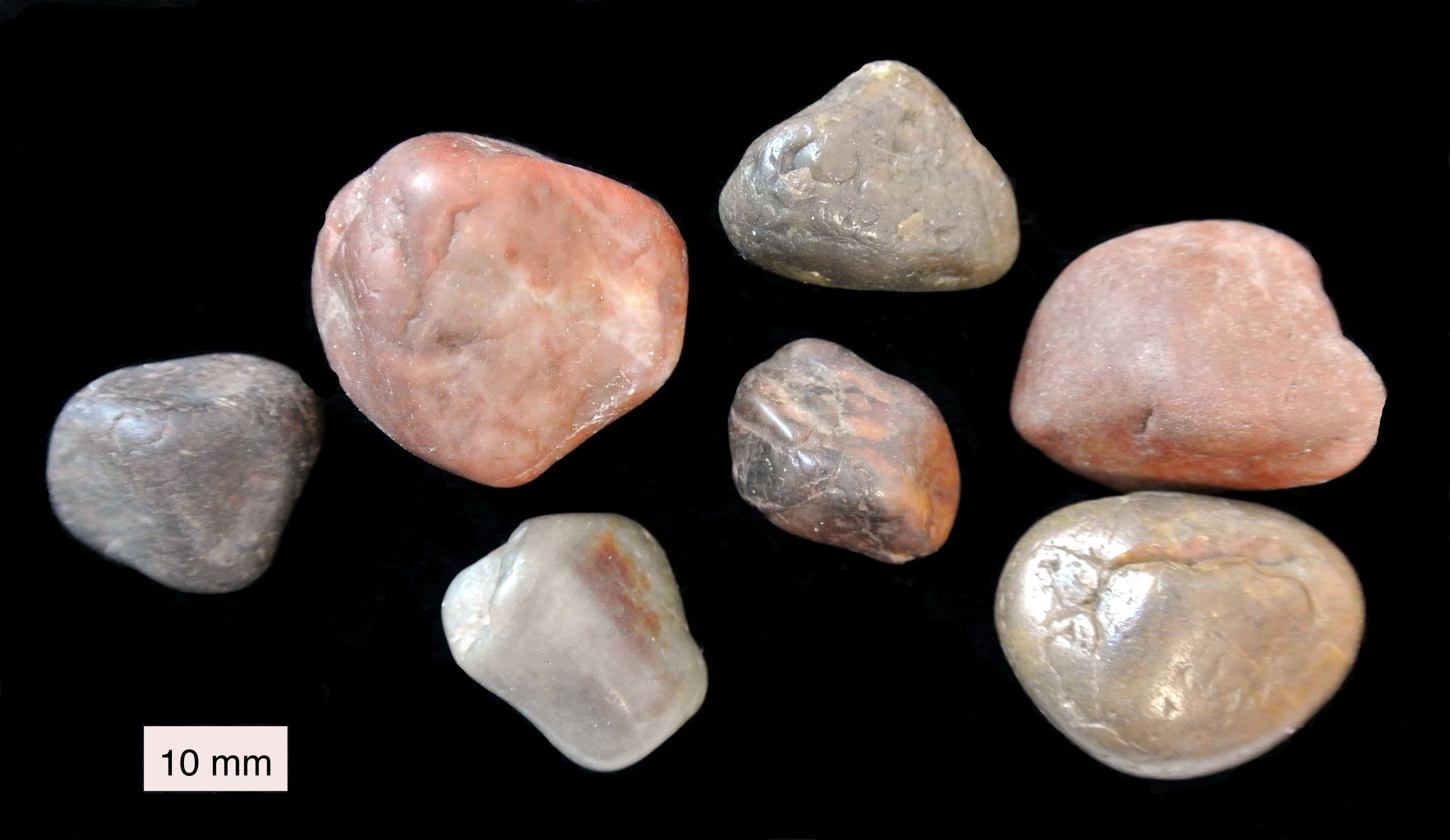
Gastroliths from Jurassic strata near Starr Springs, Utah

Among living vertebrates, gastroliths are common among crocodiles, alligators, herbivorous birds, seals and sea lions. Domestic fowl require access to grit. Stones swallowed by ostriches can exceed a length of 10 centimetres (3.9 in). Apparent microgastroliths have also been found in frog tadpoles. Ingestion of silt and gravel by tadpoles of various anuran (frog) species has been observed to improve buoyancy control.

Some extinct animals such as sauropod dinosaurs appear to have used stones to grind tough plant matter. A rare example of this is the Early Cretaceous theropod Caudipteryx zoui from northeastern China, which was discovered with a series of small stones, interpreted as gastroliths, in the area of its skeleton that would have corresponded with its abdominal region. Aquatic animals, such as plesiosaurs, may have used them as ballast, to help balance themselves or to decrease their buoyancy, as crocodiles do. Research indicates that the presence of gastroliths in elasmosaurid plesiosaurs differs from that of the short-necked plesiosaurs. While some fossil gastroliths are rounded and polished, many stones in living birds are not polished at all. Gastroliths associated with dinosaur fossils can weigh several kilograms.

Certain crayfish store gastroliths in their stomachs. Crayfish living in freshwater store these gastroliths as the presence of calcium is limited in freshwater. These gastroliths serve as a calcium source for molting.

== Paleontology ==
=== History of discovery ===
In 1906, George Reber Weiland reported the presence of worn and polished quartz pebbles associated with the remains of plesiosaurs and sauropod dinosaurs and interpreted these stones as gastroliths. In 1907, Barnum Brown found gravel in close association with the fossil remains of the duck-billed hadrosaur Claosaurus and interpreted it as gastroliths. Brown was among the first paleontologists to recognize that dinosaurs used gastroliths in their digestive systems to aid in the grinding of food. Other paleontologists over the years were unconvinced. In 1932, Friedrich von Huene found stones in Late Triassic sediments, in association with the fossil remains of the prosauropod Sellosaurus and interpreted them as gastroliths. In 1934, the Howe Quarry, a fossil location in northwestern Wyoming also yielded dinosaur bones with their associated gastroliths. As a graduate student, William Lee Stokes was unconvinced of the presence of gastroliths recovered from Late Jurassic and Cretaceous strata. However, during his career he walked those same rocks many more times, and changed his mind, writing a paper about the ubiquity of dinosaurian gastroliths in 1987.

=== Identification ===
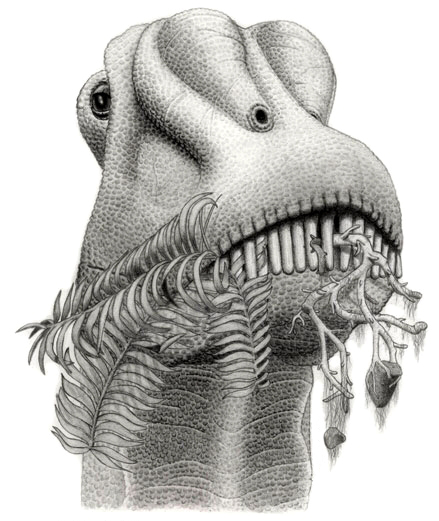
A diplodocid ingesting gastroliths entangled in vegetation it is consuming

Geologists usually require several pieces of evidence before they will accept that a rock was used by a dinosaur to aid its digestion. First, it should be rounded on all edges (and some are polished) because inside a dinosaur's gizzard any genuine gastrolith would have been acted upon by other stones and fibrous materials in a process similar to the action of a rock tumbler. Second, the stone must be unlike the rock found in its geological vicinity, i.e., its geologic context. Many gastroliths have been found in fine grained lake, mud, and swamp deposits. These environs are calm water deposits and could not carry pebbles and cobbles (unlike a river or beach). Oliver Wings also argues that the stone must be found with the fossils of the dinosaur which ingested it. It is this last criterion that causes trouble in identification, as smooth stones found without context can (possibly erroneously in some cases) be dismissed as having been polished by water or wind. Christopher H. Whittle (1988,9) pioneered scanning electron microscope analysis of wear patterns on gastroliths. Wings (2003) found that ostrich gastroliths would be deposited outside the skeleton if the carcass was deposited in an aquatic environment for as little as a few days following death. He concludes that this is likely to hold true for all birds (with the possible exception of moa) due to their air-filled bones which would cause a carcass deposited in water to float for the time it needs to rot sufficiently to allow gastroliths to escape.

Gastroliths can be distinguished from stream- or beach-rounded rocks by several criteria: gastroliths are highly polished on the higher surfaces, with little or no polish in depressions or crevices, often strongly resembling the surface of worn animal teeth. Stream- or beach-worn rocks, particularly in a high-impact environment, show less polishing on higher surfaces, often with many small pits or cracks on these higher surfaces. Finally, highly polished gastroliths often show long microscopic rilles, defined by Whittle as "longitudinal gashes, deeper than one millimeter and longer than one centimeter at a magnification of 50 times". These are presumably caused by contact with stomach acid. Since most gastroliths were scattered when the animal died and many entered a stream or beach environment, some gastroliths show a mixture of these wear features. Others were undoubtedly swallowed by other dinosaurs and highly polished gastroliths may have been swallowed repeatedly.

None of the gastroliths examined in a 2001 study of Cedarosaurus gastroliths had the "soapy" texture popularly used to distinguish gastroliths from other types of clast. The researchers dismissed using a soapy texture to identify gastroliths as "unreliable". Gastroliths tended to be universally dull, although the colors represented were varied including black, dark brown, purplish red and grey-blue. Reflectance values greater than 50% are very diagnostic for identifying gastroliths. Clasts from beaches and streams tended to have reflectance values of less than 35%. Less than ten percent of beach clasts have reflectance values lying between 50 and 80%.

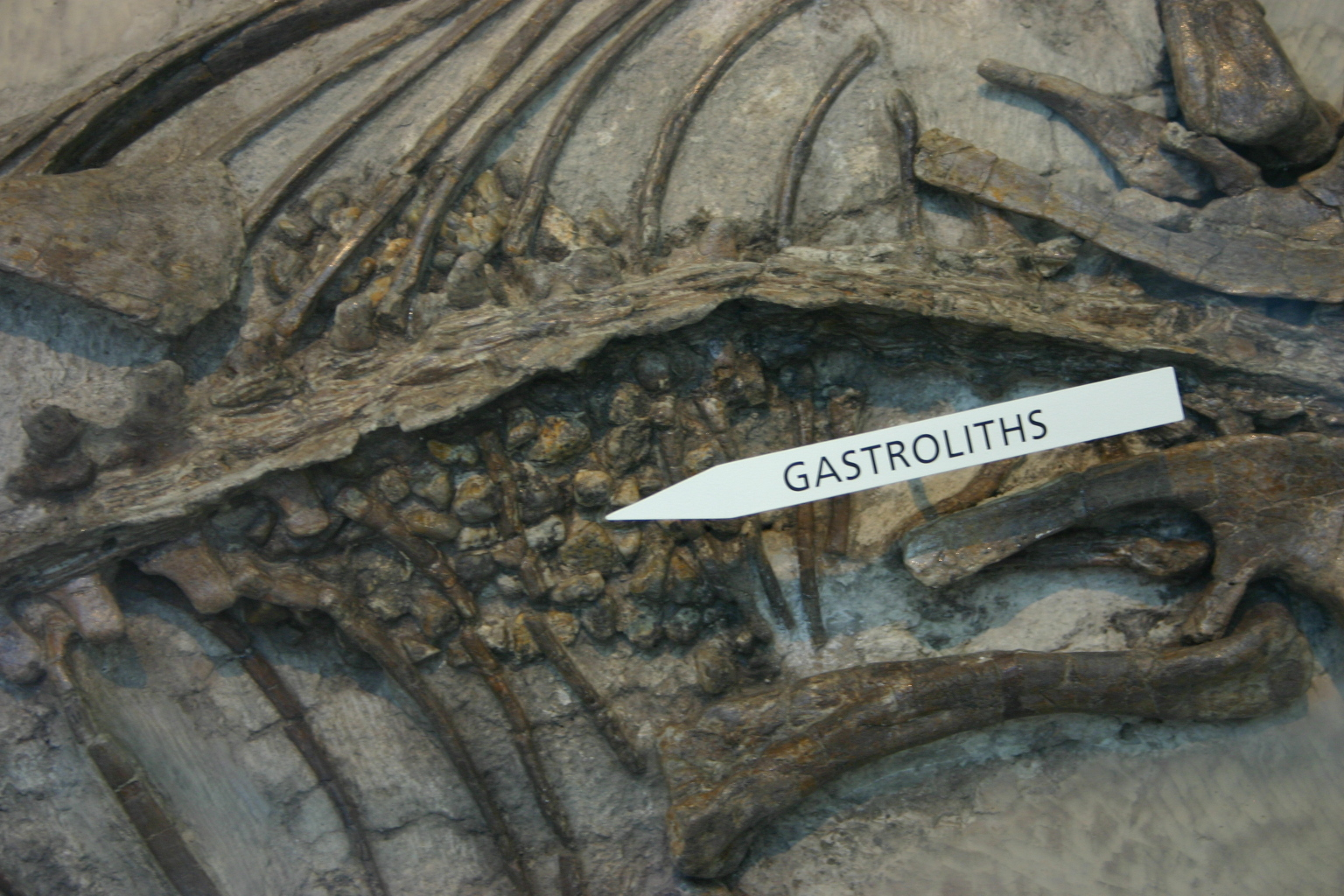
Psittacosaurus fossil with gastroliths in its stomach region, American Museum of Natural History

The American Museum of Natural History Photograph # 311488 demonstrates an articulated skeleton of a Psittacosaurus mongoliensis, from the Ondai Sair Formation, Lower Cretaceous Period of Mongolia, showing a collection of about 40 gastroliths inside the rib cage, about midway between shoulder and pelvis.

=== Geologic distribution ===
==== Jurassic ====
Gastroliths have sometimes been called Morrison stones because they are often found in the Morrison Formation (named after the town of Morrison, west of Denver, Colorado), a late Jurassic formation roughly 150 million years old. Some gastroliths are made of petrified wood. Most known instances of preserved sauropod gastroliths are from Jurassic animals.

==== Cretaceous ====
The Early Cretaceous Cedar Mountain Formation of Central Utah is full of highly polished red and black cherts, and other rounded quartzose clasts, which may partly represent gastroliths. The cherts may themselves contain fossils of ancient animals, such as corals. These stones do not appear to be associated with stream deposits and are rarely more than fist-sized, which is consistent with the idea that they are gastroliths.

=== Sauropods ===
Most known instances of preserved sauropod gastroliths are from Jurassic animals. The largest known gastroliths found in association with sauropod skeletons are approximately ten centimeters in length.

==== Cedarosaurus weiskopfae ====
In 2001 Frank Sanders, Kim Manley, and Kenneth Carpenter published a study on 115 gastroliths discovered in association with a Cedarosaurus specimen. The stones were identified as gastroliths on the basis of their tight spatial distribution, partial matrix support, and an edge-on orientation indicative of their being deposited while the carcass still had soft tissue. Their high surface reflectance values are consistent with other known dinosaur gastroliths. Nearly all of the Cedarosaurus gastroliths were found within a .06 m volume of space in the gut region of the skeleton.

The total mass of the gastroliths themselves was 7 kilograms (15 lb). Most were less than 10 millilitres (0.35 imp fl oz; 0.34 US fl oz) in volume. The least massive clast was 0.1 grams (0.0035 oz) and the most was 715 grams (25.2 oz), with most of them being toward the smaller end of that range. The clasts tended to be close to spherical in shape, although the largest specimens were also the most irregular. The largest gastroliths contributed the most to the total surface area of the set. Some gastroliths were so large and irregularly shaped that they may have been difficult to swallow. The gastroliths were mostly composed of chert, with some sandstone, siltstone, and quartzite clasts also included.

Since some of the most irregular gastroliths are also the largest, it is unlikely that they were ingested by accident. Cedarosaurus may have found irregular clasts to be attractive potential gastroliths or was not selective about shape. The clasts were generally of dull coloration, suggesting that color was not a major factor for the sauropod's decision making. The high surface area to volume ratio of the largest clasts suggests that the gastroliths may have broken down ingested plant material by grinding or crushing it. The sandstone clasts tended to be fragile and some broke in the process of collection. The sandstone gastroliths may have been rendered fragile after deposition by loss of cement caused by the external chemical environment. If the clasts had been that fragile while the animal was alive, they probably rolled and tumbled in the digestive tract. If they were more robust, they could have served as part of a ball-mill system.

=== Migration ===
Paleontologists and geologists are researching new methods of identifying gastroliths that have been found disassociated from animal remains, because of the important information they can provide, if indeed they are trace fossils. If the validity of such gastroliths can be verified, it may be possible to trace gastrolithic rocks back to their original source area where the dinosaur first swallowed the rock. This may provide important information on how dinosaurs migrated. Because the number of suspected gastroliths is substantial, they might provide significant new information and insights into the lives and behaviour of dinosaurs.

== See also ==
- Bezoar
- Calculus (medicine)
- Coprolite
- Enterolith
- Regurgitalith
