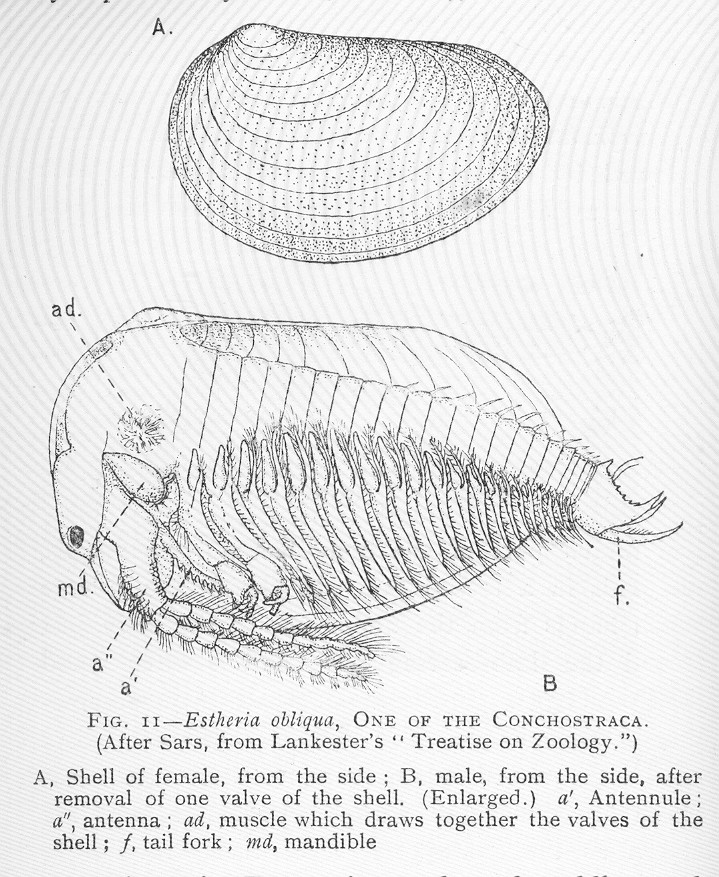
- Lioestheria obliqua

Scientific classification
- Kingdom: Animalia
- Phylum: Arthropoda
- Clade: Pancrustacea
- Class: Branchiopoda
- Family: †Lioestheriidae
- Genus: †Lioestheria

= Lioestheria =

Genus of small freshwater animals

Lioestheria is an extinct genus of clam shrimp that thrived from the Carboniferous to the Cretaceous (360.7 to 99.7 Mya). They fed on detritus, being very small slow moving, nektonic organisms that filter fed as they floated. They have been found in both marine and freshwater environments.

First identified in 1912, they have been found in Germany, Hungary, Colorado, New Mexico, Montana, Texas, Utah and China.

There are two species:

- †Lioestheria monticula
- †Lioestheria carinacurvata
