= Thuringothyris =

Thuringothyris Temporal range: Early Permian, 284–279.5 Ma

Scientific classification
- Kingdom: Animalia
- Phylum: Chordata
- Family: †Captorhinidae
- Genus: †Thuringothyris; Boy & Martens, 1991
- Species: †T. mahlendorffae

Binomial name
- †Thuringothyris mahlendorffae Boy & Martens, 1991

Extinct genus of reptiles

Thuringothyris is an extinct genus of Early Permian eureptiles known from the Thuringian Forest in central Germany.

== Description ==
Thuringothyris is known from the holotype MNG 7729, articulated well-preserved skull and partial postcranial skeleton, and from the referred specimens MNG 10652, poorly preserved skull and partial vertebral column, MNG 10647, disarticulated cranial and postcranial remains of at least four individuals, MNG 10183, slightly crushed skull and partial postcranial skeleton and MNG 11191, poorly preserved skull and partial limbs. All specimens were collected from the Tambach-Sandstein Member, the uppermost part of the Tambach Formation, dating to the Artinskian stage of the Late Cisuralian Series (or alternatively upper Rotliegend), about 284–279.5 million years ago. They were found in the Bromacker Quarry, the middle part of the Thuringian Forest, near the small town of Tambach-Dietharz.

Thuringothyris was originally thought to be protorothyridid. A redescription of all known Thuringothyris specimens by Johannes Müller, David S. Berman, Amy C. Henrici, Thomas Martens and Stuart S. Sumida in 2006 suggested that it is a sister taxon of Captorhinidae. A noval phylogenic study of primitive reptile relationships by Müller & Reisz in 2006 recovered Thuringothyris as a sister taxon of the Captorhinidae. The same results were obtained in later phylogenic analyses.

== Etymology ==
Thuringothyris was first named by Jürgen A. Boy and Thomas Martens in 1991 and the type species is Thuringothyris mahlendorffae. The generic name is named after its finding place Thuringia. The specific name honors Stefani Martens, née Mahlendorff.
