= Christopher H. Whittle =

American paleontologist

Chris Whittle (born 1959) is an educator and paleontologist who has published on a wide variety of topics including the development of paranormal beliefs, learning from popular television, museum studies, and dinosaur paleontology (Nedcolbertia, gastroliths).

== Career ==
Dr. Whittle graduated with a B.S. degree in earth sciences from the University of Massachusetts Boston, an Ed.M. from Harvard University, and a Ph.D. from the University of New Mexico. Whittle worked in the Boston Public Schools, on the Navajo Indian Reservation, the Tugboat Luna, and has been a faculty member at community colleges and universities. Whittle was on the faculty at The Jefferson School in Georgetown, Delaware. He directed the educational programs at VisionQuest Morning Star Youth Academy in Woolford, Maryland. Dr. Whittle received School Administration certification from Johns Hopkins University and then retired from education. He is currently researching the social behavior of ornithomimids.

Christopher Henry Whittle

== Partial bibliography ==
- Whittle, C.H. (2004). Development of Paranormal and Transnatural Phenomena Beliefs. 科學和無神論, 32(6), 56-57 (translated into Chinese by W. Zhen).
- Whittle, C.H. (2004). Development of Beliefs in Paranormal and Supernatural Phenomena. Skeptical Inquirer, 28(2), 43–45,55.
- Whittle, C. & Onorato, L. (2000). On the Origins of Gastroliths: Determining the Weathering Environment of Rounded and Polished Stones by Scanning Electron Microscope Analysis in Lucas, S.G., and Heckert, A.B., (eds.), Dinosaurs of New Mexico, New Mexico Museum of Natural History and Science Bulletin 17, 69–73.
- Whittle, C.H., & Everhart, M.J., (2000). Evolutionary Trends in Lithophagic Vertebrates in New Mexico and Elsewhere in Lucas, S.G., and Heckert, A.B., (eds.), Dinosaurs of New Mexico, New Mexico Museum of Natural History and Science Bulletin 17, 75–82.
- Kirkland, J.I., Britt, B.B., Whittle, C.H., Madsen, S.K., and Burge, D.L. (1998). A Small Coelurosaurian Theropod from the Yellow Cat Member of the Cedar Mountain Formation (Lower Cretaceous, Barremian) of Eastern Utah in Lucas, S.G., Kirkland, J.I., and Estep, J.W., (eds.), Lower and Middle Cretaceous Terrestrial Ecosystems. New Mexico Museum of Natural History and Science Bulletin No. 14, 239–248.
- Whittle, C.H. (1997). Proxy Climate Indicators of the Chinle Group, Upper Triassic, in New Mexico, Arizona, and Texas: Correlation of Climate to the Geological and Fossil Record in Lucas, S.G., Estep, J.W., Williamson, T.E., and Morgan, G.S., (eds.), New Mexico's Fossil Record 1. New Mexico Museum of Natural History and Science Bulletin No. 11, 9–13.
- Whittle, C. (1995). X-ray Observations of Digestion in an Alligator. Crocodile Specialists Group, IUCN World Conservation Union, Species Survival Commission Newsletter 14:3.
- Whittle, C. (1995). A Sauropod from Marine Shales in Shiprock, New Mexico. New Mexico Geology 17:2.
- Whittle, C. (1992). Evolutionary Trends in Lithophagic Vertebrates. Paleontological Society Special Publication 6:312
- Whittle, C. (1989). On the Origins of Gastroliths: Determining the Weathering Environment of Rounded and Polished Stones by Scanning Electron Microscope Analysis. Geological Society of America Bulletin 51:5.
- Whittle, C. (1988). On the Origins of Gastroliths. Journal of Vertebrate Paleontology, Supplement to 3:28.
- Whittle, C., Tierney, R.H., and Ginther, K., (1999). Learning Science and Pseudoscience from Popular Television. NASA University Research Centers Advances in Technology, Exploration and National Service: Education, Aeronautics, Earth, Autonomy, and Environment, Volume 2: Proceedings of the ACE-PURSUE Student Conference, 165–170.
- Whittle, C. (1997). The Museum as a Communication System: A Review and Synthesis. ERIC No. ED 417 076. 25p.
- Kuh, W., Simmons, J., Sorge, C., and Whittle, C. (1997). Group Study on Adult Learning at the Explora Science Center, Albuquerque, New Mexico, USA. ERIC No. ED 417 077. 31p.
- Whittle, C. (1997). On the Ethology of Female Homo sapiens sapiens at the New Mexico Museum of Natural History and Science. ERIC No. 417 078. 18p.
- Whittle, C. (1997). Teaching Science by Television: the Audience, Education, History, and the Future. ERIC No. 417 079. 34p.
