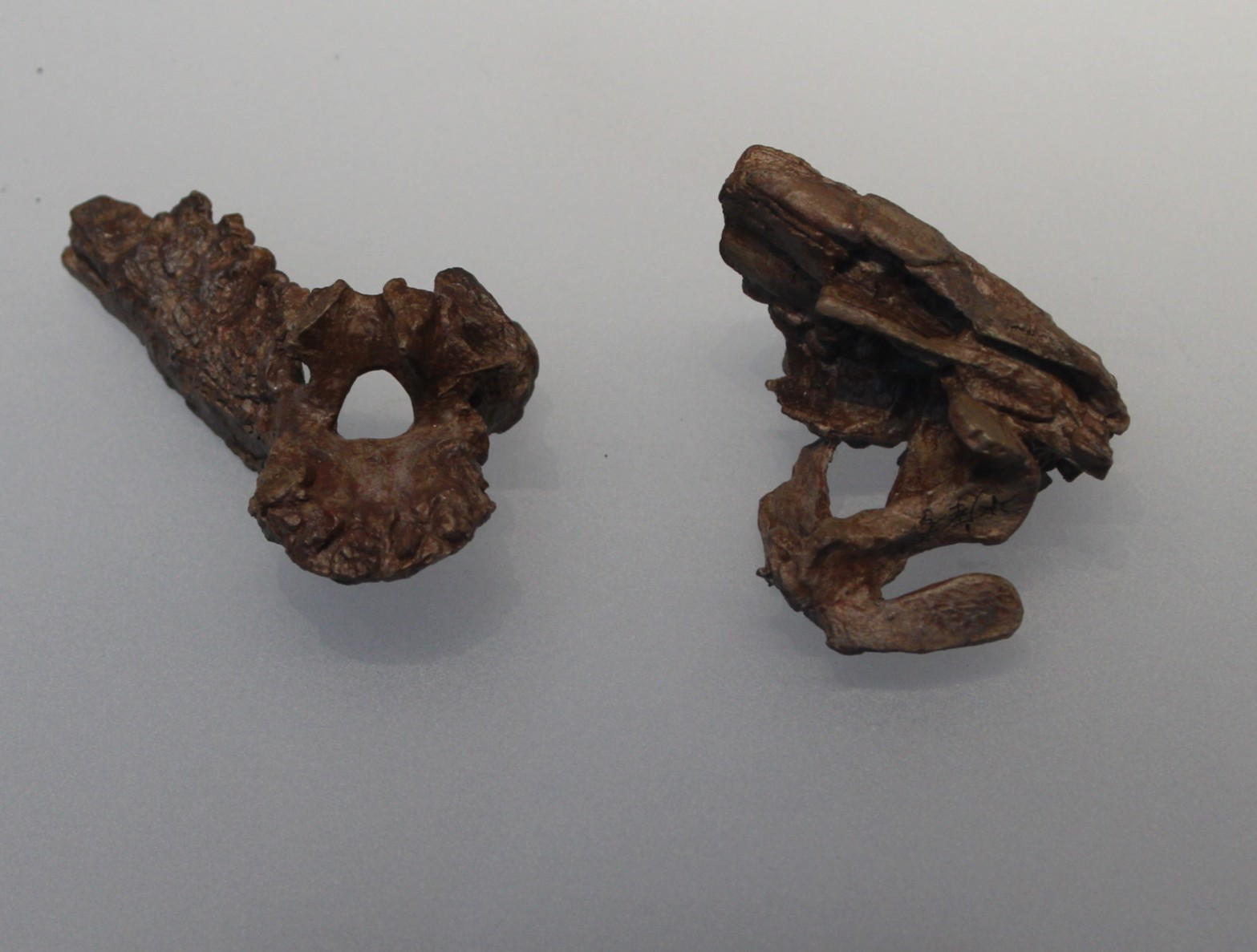
- Replica of the holotype specimen, Baoding Natural History Museum

Scientific classification
- Kingdom: Animalia
- Phylum: Chordata
- Order: †Diadectomorpha
- Family: †Diadectidae
- Genus: †Alveusdectes; Liu and Bever, 2015

Type species
- †Alveusdectes fenestralis Liu and Bever, 2015

= Alveusdectes =

Alveusdectes Temporal range: Late Permian, 256 Ma

Extinct genus of tetrapods

Alveusdectes is an extinct genus of diadectid tetrapod (represented by the type species Alveusdectes fenestralis) from the Late Permian of China. Like other diadectids, it was a large-bodied terrestrial herbivore capable of eating tough fibrous plant material. It was described in 2015 on the basis of a single partial skull and lower jaw found in the Shangshihezi Formation near the city of Jiyuan in Henan. This skull was found in a layer of the Shangshihezi Formation that dates to about 256 million years ago and contains the remains of many other terrestrial tetrapods including pareiasaurs, chroniosuchians, and therapsids. Alveusdectes is the youngest known diadectid by 16 million years and is also the only diadectid known from Asia. It likely represents a late-surviving lineage of diadectids that radiated eastward from western Laurasia (modern-day North America and Europe) into north China. Diadectids are otherwise absent from eastern Laurasia, which may reflect their low diversity at the time. Diadectids first appeared in the Late Carboniferous and were the first animals to have ever occupied the niche of large-bodied herbivores, allowing them to undergo an evolutionary radiation in the Early Permian. By the Late Permian many other groups of tetrapods had entered that niche, and increased competition among herbivores likely resulted in the eventual extinction of diadectids. Alveusdectes may have been able to persist because the fauna of north China seems to have been isolated from other Laurasian faunas during the Late Permian, meaning that fewer herbivores were competing for the same ecological space.

Alveusdectes differs from other diadectids in having a pair of large holes at the back of its skull called suborbital fenestrae, which would have been attachment points for large jaw muscles. Other defining features include a large fourth tooth in the dentary bone of the lower jaw and an elongate Meckelian fenestra positioned near the back of the jaw. Liu and Bever (2015) incorporated Alveusdectes into a phylogenetic analysis of diadectids and found it to be most closely related to Desmatodon, Diadectes, and Diasparactus. Since Desmatodon lived about 302 million years ago, the branch leading to Alveusdectes must have been isolated from other diadectids for at least 46 million years, creating a long ghost lineage of diadectids extending back into the Late Carboniferous for which no fossil record is known. Below is a cladogram from Liu and Bever (2015) showing these relationships:

- Diadectomorpha
  - Limnoscelis
  - - Tseajaia
    - Diadectidae
      - Ambedus
      - - Orobates
        - - Alveusdectes
          - Desmatodon
          - - Diadectes
            - Diasparactus
