= 1967 in paleontology =

Paleontology or palaeontology is the study of prehistoric life forms on Earth through the examination of plant and animal fossils. This includes the study of body fossils, tracks (ichnites), burrows, cast-off parts, fossilised feces (coprolites), palynomorphs and chemical residues. Because humans have encountered fossils for millennia, paleontology has a long history both before and after becoming formalized as a science. This article records significant discoveries and events related to paleontology that occurred or were published in the year 1967.

== Arthropoda ==
=== New taxa ===
| Name | Novelty | Status | Authors | Age | Unit | Location | Notes | Images |
|---|---|---|---|---|---|---|---|---|
| Camponotites | Gen et sp nov | Valid | Steinbach | Piacenzian | Willershausen clay pit | Germany | A formicine ant, type species C. silvestris | Camponotites silvestris |
| Cataglyphis constrictus | Comb nov | Jr synonym | (Mayr, 1868) | Middle Eocene | Baltic amber | Europe | Fossil formicine ant., moved to Cataglyphoides constrictus in 2008 | Cataglyphoides constrictus |

== Archosauromorphs ==
=== Dinosaurs ===
Data courtesy of George Olshevsky's dinosaur genera list.

| Name | Novelty | Status | Authors | Age | Unit | Location | Notes | Images |
|---|---|---|---|---|---|---|---|---|
| Pisanosaurus | Gen et sp nov | Valid | Casamiquela | Carnian | Ischigualasto Formation | Argentina | A primitive ornithischian | Pisanosaurus |

==== Birds ====
| Name | Novelty | Status | Authors | Age | Unit | Location | Notes | Images |
|---|---|---|---|---|---|---|---|---|
| Aechmophorus elasson | Sp. nov. | Valid | Murray | Late Pliocene | Glenns Ferry Formation | USA (California) | A Podicipedidae. | |
| Asio brevipes | Sp. nov. | Valid | Ford & Murray | Late Pliocene | Glenns Ferry Formation | USA | A Strigidae. | |
| Eogrus wetmorei | Sp. nov. | Valid | Brodkorb | Late Miocene | Tungur Formation | Mongolia | An Eogruidae | |
| Gallinula kansarum | Sp. nov. | Valid | Brodkorb | Early Pliocene | Bone Valley Formation | USA | A Rallidae. originally Fulica americana, redescribed 1967. | |
| Hirundo aprica | Sp. nov. | Valid | Feduccia | Late Pliocene | Rexroad Formation | USA | A Hirundinidae. | |
| Limosa ossivallis | Sp. nov. | Valid | Brodkorb | Early Pliocene | Bone Valley Formation | USA | A Scolopacidae. | |
| Ortalis affinis | Sp. nov. | Valid | Feduccia & Wilson | Early Pliocene | Ogallala Formation | USA | A Cracidae. | |
| Pararallus hassenkampi | Gen. et sp. nov. | Valid | Martini | Early/Middle Oligocene | | Germany | Described in Rallidae, better treated as Aves Incertae Sedis. | |
| Pliolymbus | Gen. et sp. nov. | Valid | Murray | Late Pliocene | Glenns Ferry Formation | USA | A Podicipedidae, type species P. baryosteus | |
| Pliopicus | Gen et sp. nov. | Valid | Feduccia & Wilson | Early Pliocene | Ogallala Formation | USA (Kansas) | A Picidae. Type species P. brodkorbi | |
| Podiceps discors | Sp. nov. | Valid | Murray | Late Pliocene | Glenns Ferry Formation | USA (California) | A Podicipedidae. | |
| Podilymbus majusculus | Sp. nov. | Valid | Murray | Late Pliocene | Glenns Ferry Formation] | USA | A Podicipedidae. | |

=== Pterosaurs ===
| Name | Status | Authors | Age | Unit | Location | Notes |
|---|---|---|---|---|---|---|
| Pteromonodactylus | Junior synonym | Teriaev | Late Jurassic (Tithonian) | Solnhofen Limestone | Germany | A junior synonym of Rhamphorhynchus. |

== Synapids ==
| Name | Status | Authors | Age | Unit | Location | Notes | Images |
|---|---|---|---|---|---|---|---|
| Massetognathus | Valid | Alfred Sherwood Romer | Middle Triassic | Chañares Formation | Argentina | A traversodontid cynodont. | Massetognathus |
| Limnostygis | Valid | Carroll | Pennsylvanian | | Canada (Nova Scotia) | A member of Limnoscelidae. | |

== Popular culture ==
=== Literature ===
- Bronto the Dinosaur was published. Its storyline was similar to another 1960s work aimed at children,Pataud, le petit dinosaure. The book was marketed as "educationally sound, paleontologist William A. S. Sarjeant said the book "cannot justly make that claim" on the basis of several scientific improbabilities.
