= Ichniotherium =

Ichniotherium Temporal range: Late Carboniferous–Early Permian

Trace fossil classification
- Domain: Eukaryota
- Kingdom: Animalia
- Phylum: Chordata
- Clade: Tetrapoda
- Clade: Reptiliomorpha
- Order: †Diadectomorpha
- Ichnogenus: †Ichniotherium; Pohlig, 1892

Trace fossil

Ichniotherium (meaning "marking creature") is an ichnogenus of tetrapod footprints from between the Late Carboniferous period to the Early Permian period attributed to diadectomorph track-makers. These footprints are commonly found in Europe, and have also been identified in North America and Morocco. Three ichnospecies of Ichniotherium have been proposed as valid: I. cotta, I. sphaerodactylum, and I. praesidentis.

In a 2007 study, the diadectid species Diadectes absitus was determined to be the track-maker associated with I. cotta tracks, and the related diadectid species Orobates pabsti was linked to I. praesidentis based on analysis of Lower Permian trackways and fossils skeletons in Germany
