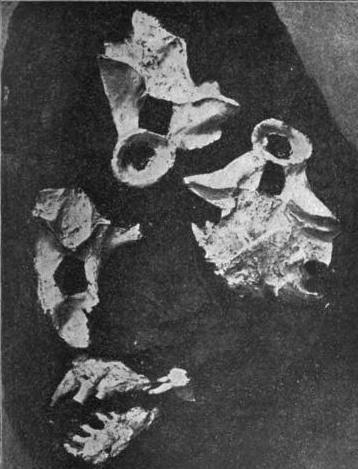
- Bones from the holotype specimen of Stephanospondylus pugnax.

Scientific classification
- Domain: Eukaryota
- Kingdom: Animalia
- Phylum: Chordata
- Order: †Diadectomorpha
- Family: †Diadectidae
- Genus: †Stephanospondylus; Stappenbeck, 1905

Species
- †S. pugnax (Geinitz and Deichmueller, 1882 [originally Phanerosaurus pugnax]) (type)

= Stephanospondylus =

Stephanospondylus Temporal range: Early Permian 300–289.5 Ma

Extinct genus of tetrapods

Stephanospondylus is an extinct genus of diadectid reptiliomorph from the Early Permian of Germany. Fossils have been found in deposits of the Lower Rotliegend near Dresden. The type species S. pugnax was originally referred to the genus Phanerosaurus in 1882 but was placed in its own genus in 1905.

== Description ==
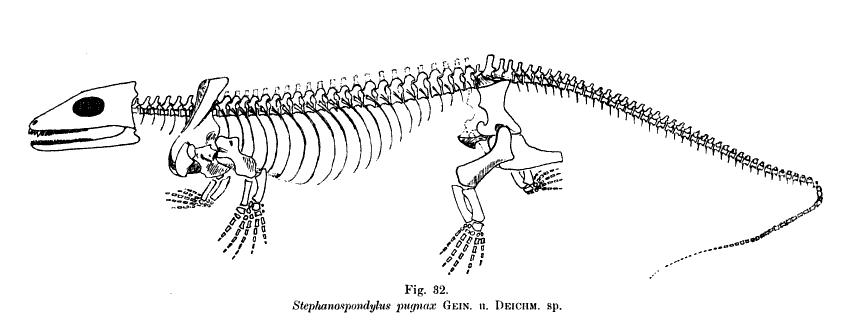
A 1905 skeletal reconstruction of Stephanospondylus based partly on material from Onchiodon.

Stephanospondylus is known only from several vertebrae and fragments of the upper and lower jaws. It was named in 1882 on the basis of two slabs, the fossils in which were thought to represent two individuals. With the erection of a new genus in 1905, the fossils were considered to be part of a single individual. In 1925, Alfred Romer determined that only parts of the jaws and some vertebrae belonged to Stephanospondylus; the other material belonged to the temnospondyl amphibian Onchiodon.

Stephanospondylus has spade-shaped teeth adapted to cutting plant material. The vertebrae are distinct from those of other diadectids in that they lack hyposphene-hypantrum articular surfaces. The holotype specimen may represent a juvenile form of another diadectid. Because so little is known of the genus, the relationship of Stephanospondylus to other diadectids is poorly known.
