= Phanerosaurus =

Scientific classification
- Domain: Eukaryota
- Kingdom: Animalia
- Phylum: Chordata
- Order: †Diadectomorpha
- Family: †Diadectidae
- Genus: †Phanerosaurus; Meyer, 1860

Species
- †P. naumanni Meyer, 1860 (type)

Extinct genus of tetrapods

Phanerosaurus is an extinct genus of diadectid reptiliomorph from the Early Permian of Germany. Fossils are known from the Leukersdorf Formation near Zwickau. German paleontologist Christian Erich Hermann von Meyer named the type species P. naumanni in 1860 on the basis of several sacral and presacral vertebrae. A second species, P. pugnax, was named in 1882 but placed in its own genus Stephanospondylus in 1905.

== Description ==
Like those of other diadectids, the vertebrae of Phanerosaurus are very wide. The neural arches are very tall and extend beyond the centra with prominent zygapophyses projecting from either side. There are few distinctive features in the vertebrae of Phanerosaurus to distinguish it from other diadectids. One of the only unique characteristics are its shortened neural spines.
