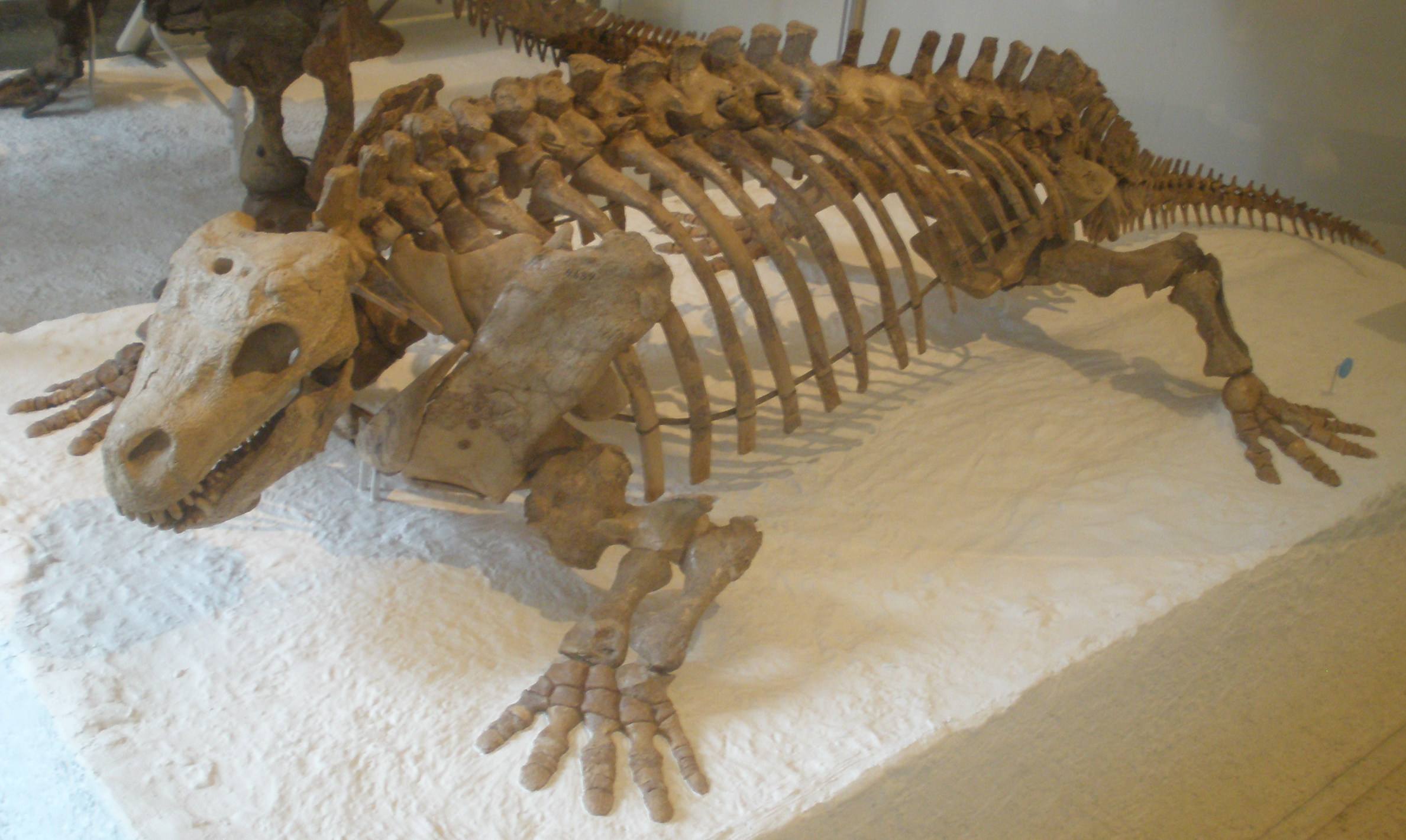
- Skeleton of Diadectes sideropelicus in the American Museum of Natural History

Scientific classification
- Kingdom: Animalia
- Phylum: Chordata
- Order: †Diadectomorpha
- Family: †Diadectidae; Cope, 1880

Genera
- †Alveusdectes; †Ambedus?; †Desmatodon; †Diadectes; †Diasparactus; †Kuwavaatakdectes; †Orobates; †Phanerosaurus; †Stephanospondylus

= Diadectidae =

Diadectids Temporal range: Late Carboniferous – Late Permian, 305–256 Ma (possible Early Carboniferous occurrence)

Extinct family of tetrapods

Diadectidae is an extinct family of early tetrapods that lived in what is now North America and Europe during the Late Carboniferous and Early Permian, and in Asia during the Late Permian. They were the first herbivorous tetrapods, and also the first fully terrestrial animals to attain large sizes. Footprints indicate that diadectids walked with an erect posture.

The best known and largest representative of the family is Diadectes, a heavily built animal that attained a maximum length of several metres. Several other genera and various fragmentary fossil remains are also known. Although well known genera like Diadectes first appear in the Late Pennsylvanian, fragmentary remains of possible diadectids are known from much earlier deposits, including a piece of lower jaw found in Mississippian strata from Tennessee.

== Description ==
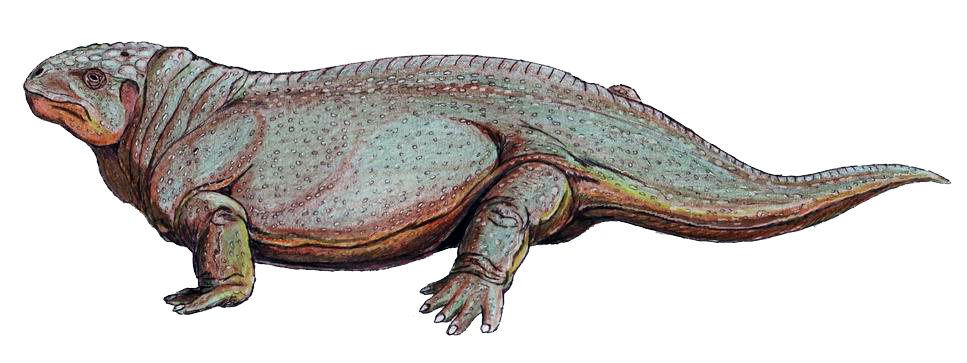
Life restoration of Diadectes, a well-known Early Permian diadectid

Diadectids have large bodies with relatively short limbs. The rib cage is barrel-shaped to accommodate a large digestive tract necessary for the digestion of cellulose in plants. The skulls of diadectids are wide and deep with blunt snouts. The internal nares (holes for the nostrils) are also short. Paleontologist E.C. Case compared diadectids to turtles in 1907, noting their large pectoral girdles, short, strong limbs, and robust skulls. Case described them as "lowly, sluggish, inoffensive herbivorous reptiles, clad in an armor of plate to protect them from the fiercely carnivorous pelycosaurs." Foot impressions of diadectids indicate that their skin covering was made of epidermal scales similar to those of living reptiles.

Diadectids have a heterodont dentition, meaning that their teeth vary in shape along the length of the jaws. The teeth are wide and bear many cusps or projections, an indication that diadectids ate tough plants. Some teeth are leaf-shaped and laterally compressed, another indication that diadectids were able to shred plant material. The procumbent front teeth of the lower jaw project forward. Diadectids likely had strong jaw muscles for processing plant material; the placement of the jaw joints above or below the level of the occlusal plane (the plane at which the teeth come together) would have given diadectid jaws mechanical advantage. The joints themselves give the jaws a complex range of movement suitable for consuming plants. Large holes and cavities in the skull called adductor chambers and temporal openings would have provided room for large jaw-closing muscles. A ridge on the dentary bone of the lower jaw may have provided a surface for chewing or even supported a beak.

== History of study ==
The first diadectid to be described was Diadectes. American paleontologist Edward Drinker Cope named the genus in 1878 on the basis of several vertebrae and teeth from the Early Permian of Texas. Cope erected the family Diadectidae in 1880 to include Diadectes and Empedocles, a genus he named two years earlier. Nothodon, named by Cope's rival Othniel Charles Marsh in 1878, was soon placed in the family.

Cope named several other diadectids, including Helodectes in 1880, Chilonyx and Empedias in 1883, and Bolbodon in 1896. Paleontologist E.C. Case named four other diadectids: Desmatodon in 1908, Diasparactus in 1910, Diadectoides in 1911, and Animasaurus along with paleontologist Samuel Wendell Williston in 1912. Case and Williston considered Marsh's Nothodon and Cope's Bolbodon to be synonymous with Diadectes. Marsh named Nothodon in the American Journal of Science only five days before Cope described Diadectes in Proceedings of the American Philosophical Society. Under rules of the International Code of Zoological Nomenclature, the name Nothodon would have priority over Diadectes, but because the name Diadectes has been in use since Case and Williston first synonymized the genera, Diadectes remains the accepted name.

In North America, diadectids are known from Texas, Colorado, Utah, New Mexico, Oklahoma, Ohio, West Virginia, Pennsylvania, and Prince Edward Island. A possible diadectid has also been found from Tennessee. It is known from a broken lower jaw and several teeth found in Mississippian-age (Chesterian) strata that are likely part of the Bangor Formation. In a detailed review of Diadectidae, paleontologist E.C. Olson placed three North American genera within the family: Diadectes, Diasparactus, and Desmatodon. Chilonyx, Empedias, Diadectoides, and Animasaurus were synonymized with Diadectes, and four species of Diadectes (D. sideropelicus, D. tenuitectes, D. lentus, and D. carinatus) were recognized. A fourth genus, Ambedus, was named in 2004 from the Early Permian of Ohio.

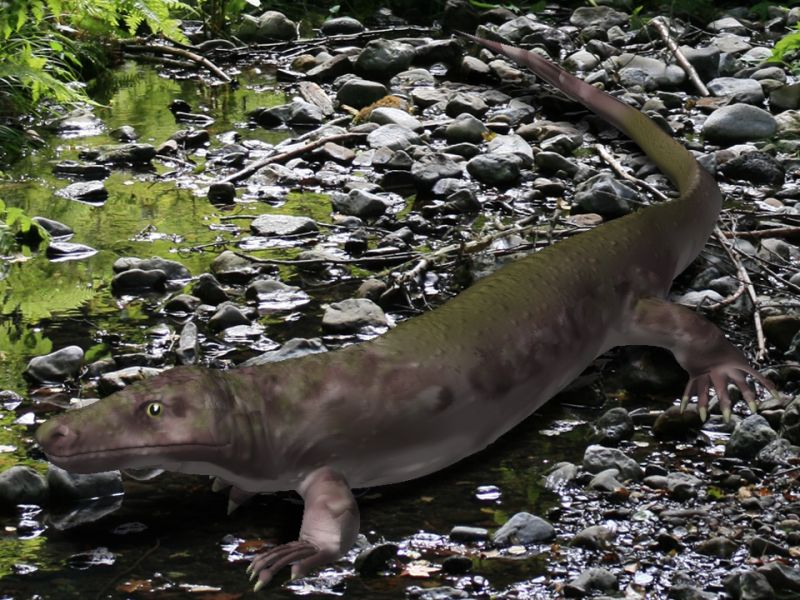
Orobates, a diadectid from Germany

Diadectids are also known from Germany. Phanerosaurus was described from several vertebrae near Zwickau by German paleontologist Christian Erich Hermann von Meyer in 1860, but was not recognized as a diadectid until 1925. A second species of Phanerosaurus was identified from some vertebrae and a fragmentary skull in 1882, and was given its own genus, Stephanospondylus, in 1905. In 1998, a new species of Diadectes, D. absitus, was described from the Bromacker sandstone quarry of the Tambach Formation in the Thuringian Forest of central Germany. A new genus of diadectid called Orobates was also named from the Bromacker Quarry in 2004.

In 2015, the known geographic range of diadectids was expanded with the description of a new genus and species of diadectid from China, Alveusdectes fenestralis. Alveusdectes is also the youngest known diadectid by 16 million years, coming from a unit of the Late Permian Shangshihezi Formation that dates to about 256 million years. However, the assignment of Alveusdectes to Diadectidae has been questioned. A phylogenetic analysis from 2024 recovers Alveusdectes as a non-diadectomorph synapsid, more closely related to the eothyridids Eothyris and Oedaleops.

== Classification ==
Diadectids have long been considered close relatives of the amniotes, tetrapods that lay eggs on land or retain the fertilized egg within the mother. In 1987, the paleontologist D.M.S. Watson placed the family in the larger group Diadectomorpha, which includes another family of large-bodied diadectomorphs, the Limnoscelidae, as well as the monotypic diadectomorph family Tseajaiidae, represented by the genus Tseajaia. Throughout the twentieth century, amniotes and diadectomorphs were often grouped together using the old name Cotylosauria, a name originally used for the most basal grade of what was then thought to be reptiles. In the early part of the century, many paleontologists regarded diadectids, along with other cotylosaurs (such as placodonts), to be close relatives of turtles. In most recent studies of early tetrapod phylogeny, Cotylosauria is no longer recognized and Diadectomorpha is placed as the sister taxon of Amniota. However, while the majority of analyses now place diadectids outside Amniota, some have found them to be true amniotes.

Most phylogenetic studies of the three diadectomorph families – Diadectidae, Limnoscelidae, and Tseajaiidae – have found diadectids and limnoscelids to be more closely related to each other than either is to Tseajaia. In other words, Diadectidae and Limnoscelidae form a clade within Diadectomorpha and Tseajaia is excluded from the clade. In a 2010 phylogenetic analysis, Diadectidae formed a clade that was characterized by wide cheek teeth with cusps on either side. Unlike previous studies, it was found to be more closely related to Tseajaiidae than Limnoscelidae. The family was defined as Diadectes and all taxa sharing a more recent common ancestor with Diadectes than with Tseajaia. Below is a cladogram modified from the 2010 analysis:

- Diadectomorpha
  - Limnoscelidae
  - - Tseajaiidae
    - Diadectidae
      - Ambedus pusillus?
      - - Oradectes sanmiguelensis
        - - Orobates pabsti
          - - Desmatodon hesperis
            - - Silvadectes absitus
              - - Diadectes tenuitectes
                - Diadectes sideropelicus
                - Diasparactus zenos

Diadectes is the best known diadectid, with six species named since its initial description. In a 2005 phylogenetic analysis, most species of Diadectes formed a clade with Diasparactus zenos. Two species, Diadectes absitus and Diadectes sanmiguelensis, were placed in more basal positions. These species possess primitive characteristics found in non-diadectid forms, such as Limnoscelis and Tseajaia. Because D. absitus and D. sanmiguelensis were placed far from other species of Diadectes in the analysis, their assignment to the genus was questioned. The same results were found in the 2010 analysis. Two new genera were erected in the study to include D. absitus and D. sanmiguelensis. D. sanmiguelensis, the more basal of the two forms, was placed in the new genus Oradectes. D. absitus was renamed Silvadectes. However, according to the ICZN, a name presented in an initially unpublished thesis such as Kissel's is not valid. Because the names Oradectes and Silvadectes have not yet been formally erected in a published paper, they were not, as of 2010, considered valid. A 2024 study found "D. sanmiguelensis" as more basal than Orobates pabsti, thus rendering the genus Diadectes polyphyletic. To solve this, the authors erected the new genus Kuwavaatakdectes for Kuwavaatakdectes sanmiguelensis.

In a 2013 study, David Berman argued that there wasn't enough evidence to justify Ambedus being in Diadectidae. He stated in his paper that its assignment to Diadectidae is based only on several isolated maxillae and dentaries containing cheek teeth that only exhibited a resemblance in their molar-like morphology to those in diadectids. There are also a number of other characteristics that distinguish Ambedus from all other diadectids, such as a shallow rather than deep deep dentary, and relatively high maxillary and dentary tooth counts, among other characteristics that distinguish them from Diadectidae. Furthermore, the appearance of Ambedus pusillus so late in the fossil record also casts a doubt on the fact that it is supposed to represent the basalmost member of the Diadectidae lineage. In contrast, the first diadectids from the Upper Pennsylvanian were far more developed and had the characteristic dentary and maxillary features of the Diadectidae lineage. This implies that there should be a ghost lineage that goes back all the way back to the Middle Pennsylvanian, which is highly unlikely according to Berman.

== Evolutionary history ==
Diadectids were some of the first tetrapods, or four-legged vertebrates, to attain large sizes. Diadectids first appear in the Late Carboniferous with the genus Desmatodon, although recently described bones from Tennessee suggest that they may have appeared even earlier in the Early Carboniferous. They underwent a small evolutionary radiation in the Late Carboniferous and Early Permian, diversifying into thirteen species and outnumbering other diadectomorphs, such as the limnoscelids. This radiation was likely the result of diadectids' expansion into a new herbivorous ecological niche that was previously unfilled.

Diadectids had a much wider geographic distribution than their relatives; while the distribution of limnoscelids is limited to parts of North America and Tseajaia is restricted to just the southwestern United States, diadectids are present in North America, Europe, and Asia. During the late Carboniferous and Permian these regions formed a single landmass called Laurasia, which comprised the northern portion of the supercontinent Pangea. For most of their evolutionary history, diadectids were likely limited to the western half of Laurasia, which is now North America and Europe. The presence of the late-surviving Alveusdectes in China suggests that diadectids radiated eastward across Laurasia. They could not have reached what is now China until the Middle Permian because, prior to that time, the Tethys Sea separated it from the rest of Laurasia. The group does not seem to have diversified to the same extent in the east as they did in the west given that no diadectids are known from Russia, which has an extensive fossil record of Early and Middle Permian tetrapod assemblages.

== Paleobiology ==
=== Diet ===
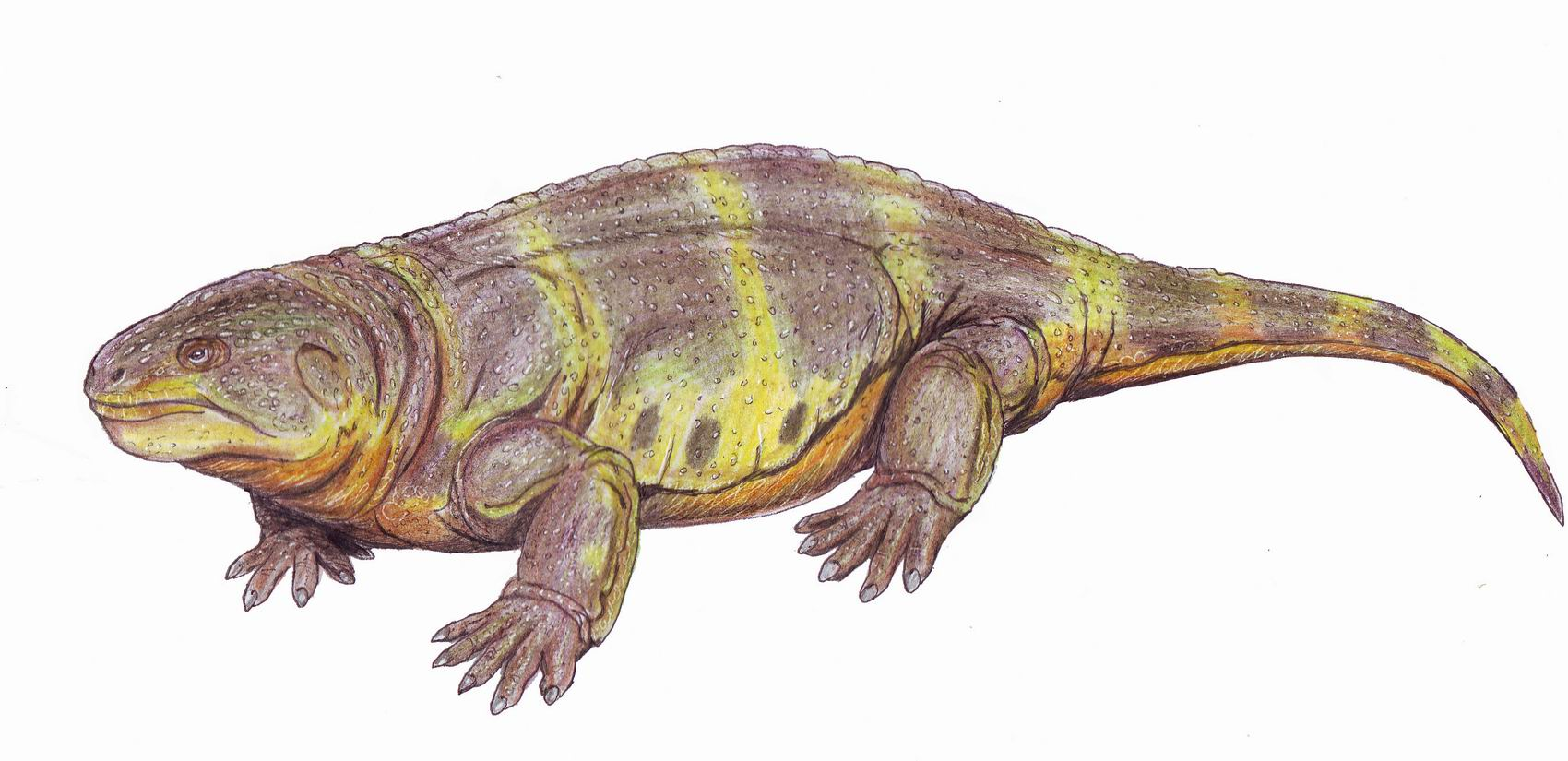
Life restoration of Diasparactus

Diadectids were the first fully herbivorous tetrapods. Although several other groups of early tetrapods independently acquired herbivory, diadectids were the only Carboniferous tetrapods that were able to process high-fiber terrestrial plants. Diadectids were also the most diverse group of herbivores, representing the first radiation of plant-eating tetrapods. Both Cope and Marsh recognized that diadectids were herbivores in 1878 when they studied their distinctively broad, cusped teeth (in his description of Diadectes, Cope mentioned, "animals belonging to this genus were, in all probability, herbivorous").

=== Locomotion ===
Diadectids were once thought to be sprawling animals with their short, robust legs positioned to the sides of their large bodies. Despite this, several lines of evidence, including trackways and limb morphology, suggest that diadectids moved in a more erect posture. While earlier tetrapods possess several simple tarsal bones in their ankles, diadectids have a more complex astragalus formed from the fusion of these bones. Astragali are present in terrestrial amniotes and are identical in structure to those of diadectids. Therefore, the ankle structure of diadectids bears a closer resemblance to those of advanced terrestrial vertebrates like mammals and reptiles than those of earlier tetrapods. Since diadectids are the only diadectomorphs with astragali, they likely developed the structure independent of amniotes.

Although they bear similarities to those of amniotes, the tarsal bones of diadectids are poorly ossified and loosely connected. The digits of the foot connect only to the fourth distal tarsal, providing a wide range of movement in the foot. This flexibility enabled diadectids to rotate their feet in a forward position while walking, providing greater force when pushing off. The feet could also be placed closer to the midline of the body to give diadectids an erect stance.

Evidence for an erect stance can be found in trackways attributed to diadectids. The most well-preserved of these trackways are present in the Tambach Formation in central Germany. A 2007 study identified two different ichnospecies, Ichniotherium cottae and I. sphaerodactylum, as footprints of the diadectids Silvadectes absitus and Orobates pabsti, respectively. This was the first species-level identification of trackmakers of Paleozoic-era trackways, making the footprints the oldest yet associated with specific animal species. The close positioning of the footprints attributed to the more advanced diadectides suggests that the animals held their feet almost underneath their bodies, giving them a more efficient gait and to some degree paralleling the stance of mammals more than that of the sprawling amphibians and most reptiles.

== General references ==
- Carroll, R. L. (1988). Vertebrate Paleontology and Evolution. WH Freeman and Company, New York. ISBN 0-7167-1822-7
