= Kuwavaatakdectes =

Scientific classification
- Kingdom: Animalia
- Phylum: Chordata
- Order: †Diadectomorpha
- Family: †Diadectidae
- Genus: †Kuwavaatakdectes; Ponstein, MacDougall & Fröbisch, 2024
- Species: †K. sanmiguelensis

Binomial name
- †Kuwavaatakdectes sanmiguelensis (Lewis & Vaughn, 1965)

Synonyms
- Oradectes Kissel, 2010

Extinct early Permian genus of reptiles

Kuwavaatakdectes is a genus of diadectid from the early Permian of Colorado.

== Taxonomy ==
Kuwavaatakdectes was originally named as a species of Diadectes, D. sanmiguelensis, by Lewis and Vaughn in 1965, based on a single specimen from San Miguel County, Colorado. However, a 2010 dissertation found it to be generically distinct from the Diadectes type species, informally renaming it Oradectes, although this genus is not valid under ICZN rules due to it having been coined in a dissertation. The generic name Oradectes means 'margin biter', a reference to the splenial being the only bone flooring the Meckelian fenestra, an autapomorphy of the genus. A paper published in 2024 formally erected Kuwavaatakdectes for the sole species Kuwavaatakdectes sanmiguelensis. The word 'Kuwavaatak' similarly means margin, in the Ute language spoken by the Núuchi-u people native to Colorado. Thus, the generic name remains in the spirit of Kissel's (2010) suggestion, while simultaneously honouring the native people of Colorado.
