= Limnostygis =

Limnostygis Temporal range: Pennsylvanian 314.6–307 Ma

Scientific classification
- Kingdom: Animalia
- Phylum: Chordata
- Clade: Tetrapoda
- Class: incertae sedis
- Genus: †Limnostygis; Carroll, 1967

Type species
- †L. relictus Carroll, 1967

Limnostygis is a dubious genus of tetrapod from the Pennsylvanian of Nova Scotia. The fragmentary holotype specimen was found in a fossilized tree stump in the Morien Group. Formerly thought to be a limnoscelid, this specimen has since been considered to be a combination of possible ophiacodont and captorhinid material.
