= Aechmophorus elasson =

Aechmophorus elasson Temporal range: Piacenzian

Scientific classification
- Domain: Eukaryota
- Kingdom: Animalia
- Phylum: Chordata
- Class: Aves
- Order: Podicipediformes
- Family: Podicipedidae
- Genus: Aechmophorus
- Species: †A. elasson

Binomial name
- †Aechmophorus elasson Murray, 1967

Extinct species of grebe

Aechmophorus elasson is an extinct species of grebe recovered from the Piacenzian age of the United States.

== History ==
The specimens were collected in the summer of 1962 from Idaho, United States by Claude W. Hibbard and the species was named in 1967 by Bertram G. Murray. Material was later described from California, United States by Robert M. Chandler (1990).

== Description ==
The material overall resembles those of extant species of Aechmophorus, although slightly smaller in dimensions. The holotype are the distal end of the humerus and a slightly worn left ulna. Other referred material from the Hagerman Fossil Beds National Monument include several fragmentary remains of the humeri, ulnae and a proximal of a tarsometatarsus, as well as two complete and two distal portions of coracoids. Murrary (1967) did not provide a detailed osteological diagnosis on the Idaho material. Chandler (1990) would provide one for both the Idaho and California specimens. The California material includes a right ulna that is missing a quarter of its distal end, a right femur, left tibiotarsus missing its cnemial crests, and tarsometatarsi (a complete left tarsometatarsus and a right one missing their distal end). As noted from Murrary (1967), Chandler (1990) finds the osteological diagnosis to be similar to extant Aechmophorus.

== Classification ==
A. elasson is an extinct species of Aechmophorus and possibly the ancestral species to both Clark's grebe (A. clarkii) and western grebe (A. occidentalis).

== Paleobiology ==
A. elasson is known from the Glenns Ferry Formation and the San Diego Formation. One of the handful fossil species of an extant genus of North American grebe, A. elasson is relatively smaller in comparison to both Clark's grebe and western grebe, and fossil evidence of Pleistocene specimens of the latter genus suggest a size increased occurred in the genus.
