= Ambedus =

Ambedus Temporal range: Early Permian, Artinskian–Kungurian

Scientific classification
- Domain: Eukaryota
- Kingdom: Animalia
- Phylum: Chordata
- Order: †Diadectomorpha
- Family: †Diadectidae
- Genus: †Ambedus; Kissel and Reisz, 2004

Species
- †A. pusillus Kissel and Reisz, 2004 (type)

Extinct genus of tetrapods

Ambedus is an extinct genus of possible diadectid reptiliomorph. Fossils have been found from the Early Permian Dunkard Group of Monroe County, Ohio. The type species A. pusillus was named in 2004. The genus name comes from the Latin word ambedo meaning "to nibble", in reference to its herbivorous diet. The specific name pusillus means "tiny" in Latin.

== Description ==
Ambedus is a small tetrapod, possible Diadectid, known only from maxillae and dentary bones. It is usually considered the most primitive diadectid because unlike other forms it had a small, shallow lower jaw and many simple, conical teeth. It was also smaller than the later, rather bulky diadectids. Later diadectids have deep jaws with few teeth and forward-projecting incisiforms at the tips of the jaws for consuming plant material, and a corresponding greater girth.

== Phylogeny ==
David Berman's 2013 paper argued against the inclusion of Ambedus in Diadectidae. He stated in his paper that its assignment to Diadectidae is based only on several isolated maxillae and dentaries containing cheek teeth that only exhibited a resemblance in their molar-like morphology to those in Diadectids. There are also a number of other characteristics that distinguish Ambedus from all other Diadectids, such as a shallow rather than deep deep dentary, and relatively high maxillary and dentary tooth counts, among other characteristics that distinguish them from Diadectids. Furthermore, the appearance of Ambedus pusillus so late in the fossil record, after all known Diadectomorphs have died out, also casts a doubt on the fact that it is supposed to represent the basalmost member of the Diadectid lineage. In contrast, the first Diadectids from the Upper Pennsylvanian were way more developed and had the characteristic dentary and maxillary features of the Diadectid lineage. This implicates that there should be a ghost lineage that goes back all the way back to the Middle Pennsylvanian, which is highly unlikely according to Berman.

== Paleobiology ==
The holotype specimen of Ambedus was found from an outcrop of the Early Permian the Greene Formation on Clark Hill in Monroe County, Ohio. It was found alongside fossils of the lungfish Sagenodus, the temnospondyl amphibian Trimerorhachis, an embolomere reptiliomorph, and the synapsid Ctenospondylus. These animals likely lived alongside a freshwater lake or pond.
