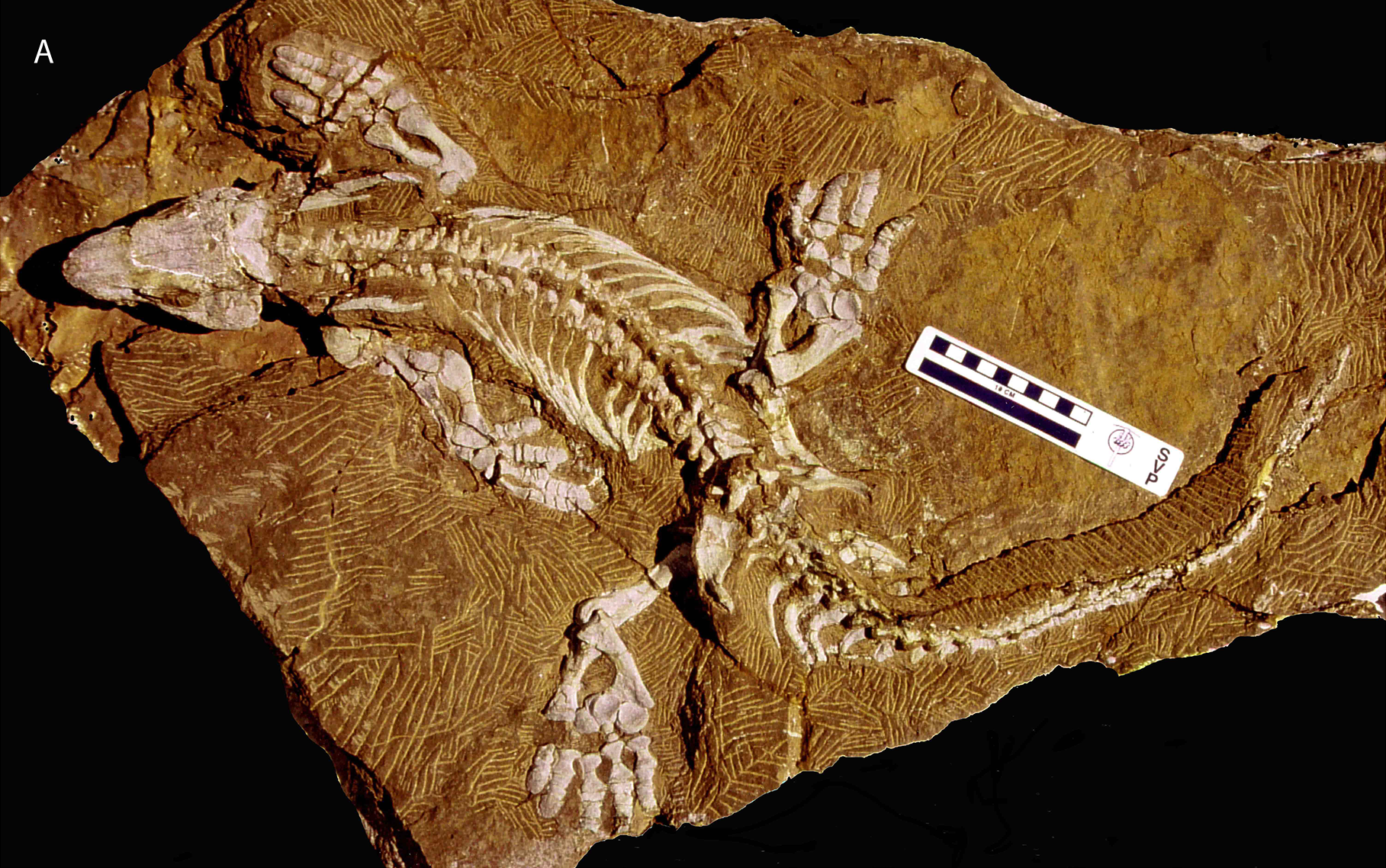
- Holotype specimen

Scientific classification
- Kingdom: Animalia
- Phylum: Chordata
- Order: †Diadectomorpha
- Family: †Diadectidae
- Genus: †Orobates; Berman et al., 2004

Type species
- Orobates pabsti Berman et al., 2004

= Orobates =

Orobates Temporal range: Cisuralian

Extinct genus of reptiliomorphs

Orobates is an extinct genus of diadectid reptiliomorphs that lived during the Early Permian. Its fossilised remains were found in Germany. A combination of primitive and derived traits (i.e. autapomorphic and plesiomorphic) distinguish it from all other well-known members of Diadectidae, a family of herbivorous reptiliomorphs. It weighed about 4 kg and appears to have been part of an upland fauna, browsing on high fibre plants.

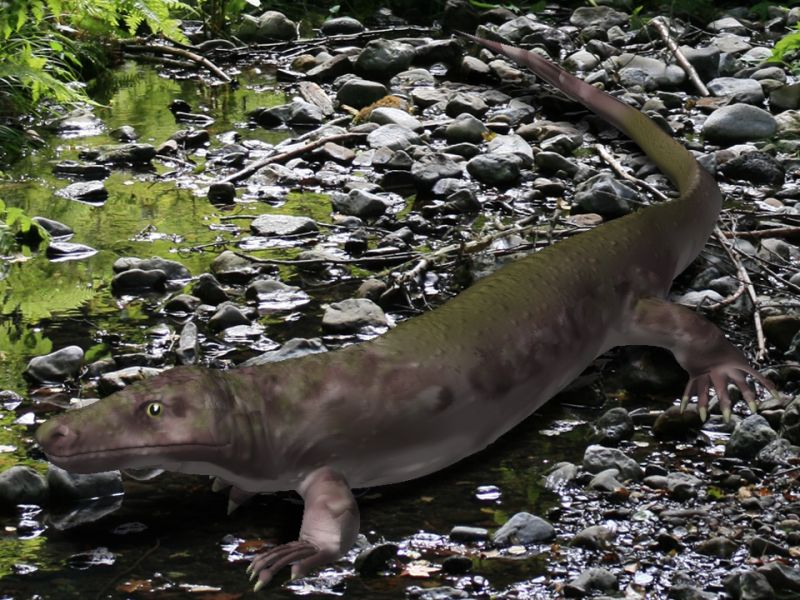
Restoration

== Locomotion ==
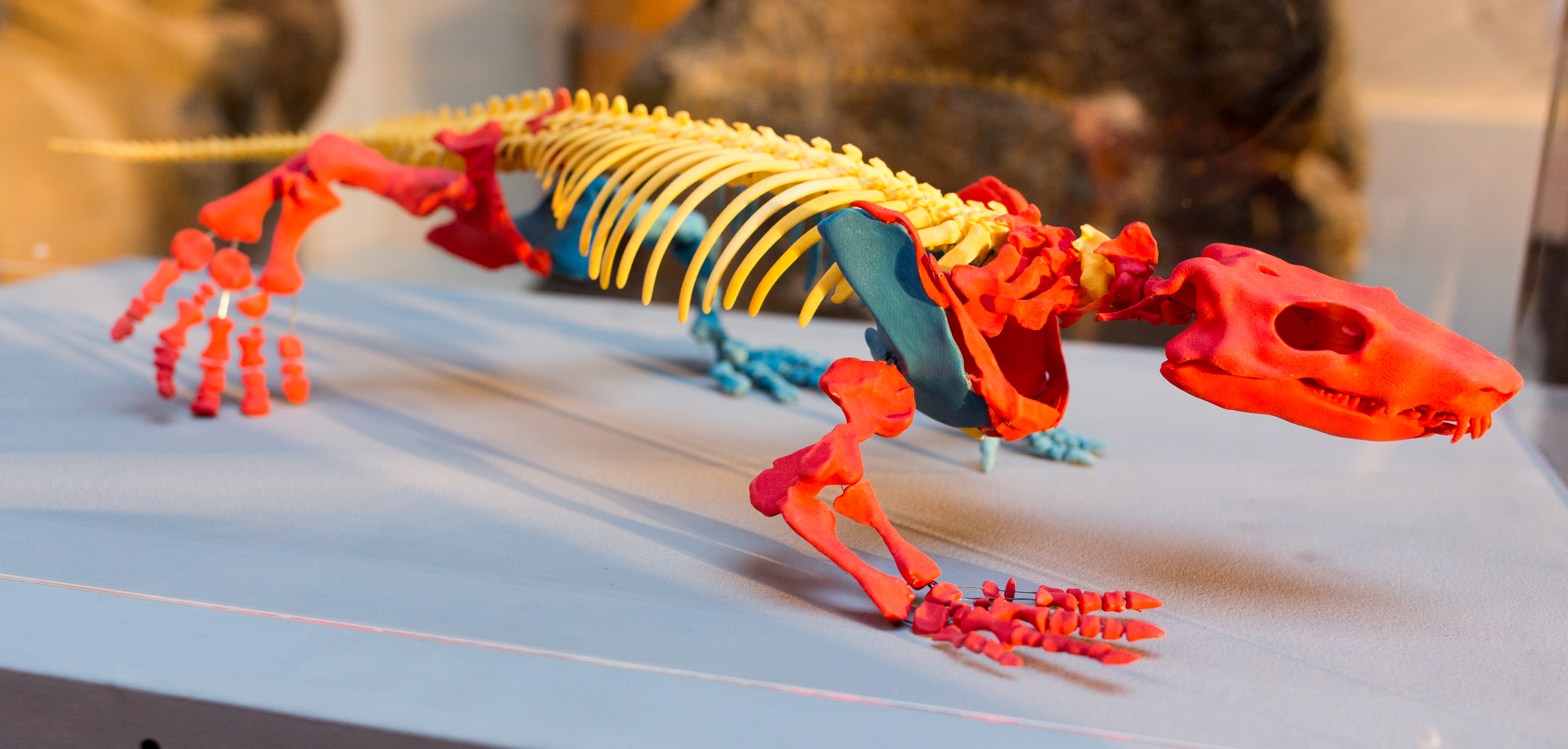
Model of an Orobates made by the Humboldt University: red parts are reconstructed from the fossil, blue parts are mirrors of the red parts, and yellow parts are estimations.

The trace fossil species Ichniotherium sphaerodactylum, from Bromacker in Germany, has been attributed to Orobates. A study in 2015 found that the genus was characterized by a long body and tail, with fairly short legs and a short skull compared to the more derived Diadectes. This indicates Orobates was less specialised for long treks compared to Diadectes. A three-dimensional digital reconstruction of the holotype specimen allowed further analysis of the postcranium. An analysis of the mobility of the hip joint of the reconstructed holotype indicated that its limb function was similar to that of modern salamanders.

A detailed multidisciplinary study published in 2019 found that Orobates moved more like modern caimans than salamanders. The study began with the digitization of its holotype specimen using CT scanning to figure out the range of motion of its joints. A digital model of its fossil trackways helped narrow down the possibilities. The researchers also studied the locomotion of four extant sprawling tetrapods using X-ray motion analysis. The extant tetrapods chosen for the study were axolotls, blue-tongued skinks, green iguanas, and spectacled caimans.

The biomechanical data of the locomotion of the extant tetrapods and the digital models of Orobates' holotype and fossilized trackways were then used to create a dynamic simulation. It allowed the researchers to account for physical factors like gravity, friction, and balance. The simulation was then validated under real-world conditions with a life-sized robot called OroBOT. The researchers tested 512 different gaits and found that Orobates moved most like a caiman. It had a relatively erect posture and walked with a slight side-to-side motion. A follow-up study focused on the muscle strains occurring within the muscles of the hindlimb in modelled strides at different postures. While results remained inconclusive towards favouring a single posture during locomotion, the overall results did not contradict the previous study based on OroBOT.
