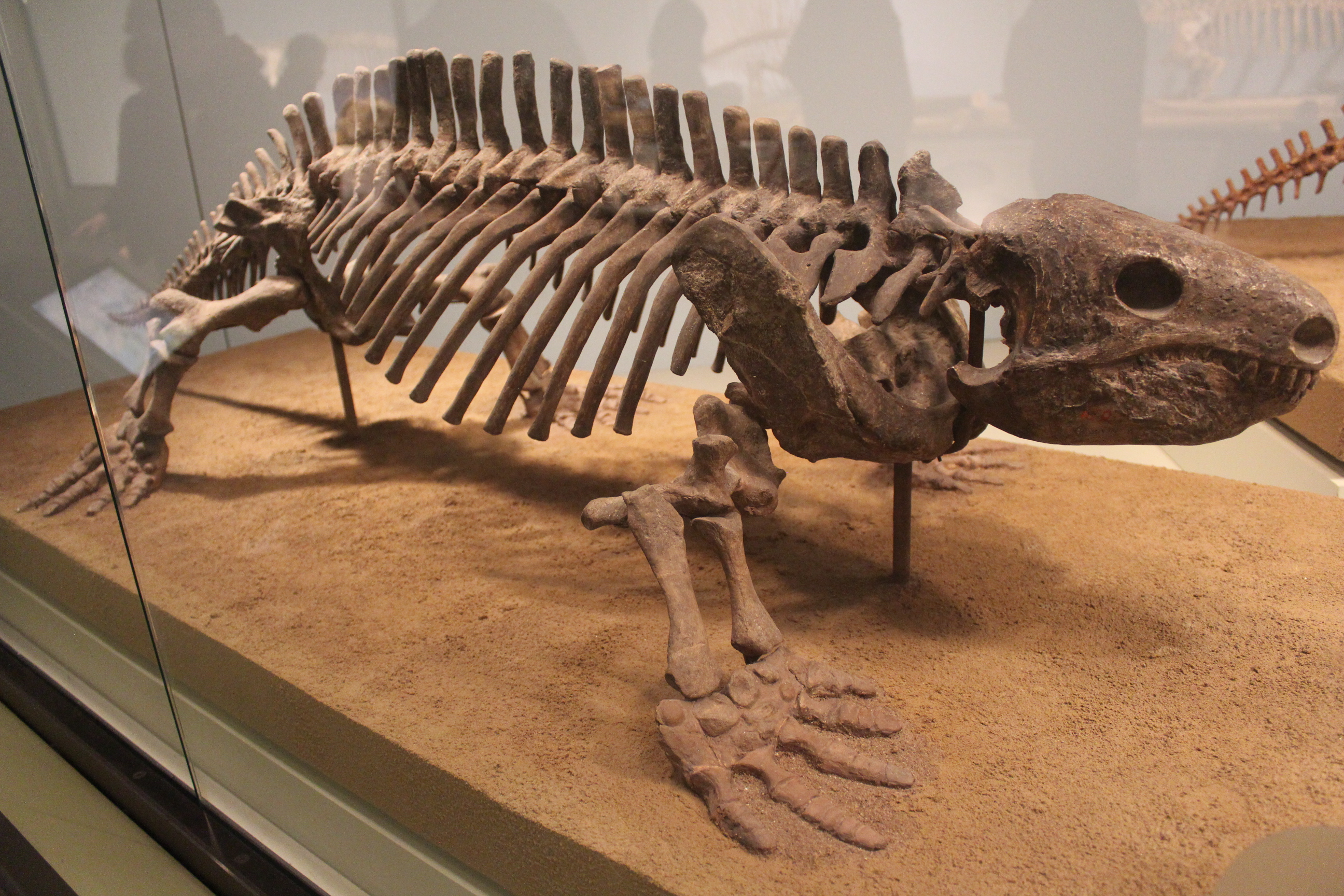
- Skeleton of Diasparactus zenos in the Field Museum of Natural History.

Scientific classification
- Kingdom: Animalia
- Phylum: Chordata
- Clade: Reptiliomorpha
- Order: †Diadectomorpha
- Family: †Diadectidae
- Genus: †Diasparactus; Case, 1910

Type species
- †Diasparactus zenos Case, 1910

= Diasparactus =

Diasparactus Temporal range: Early Permian, 296.4–295.0 Ma

Extinct genus of tetrapods

Diasparactus is an extinct genus of diadectid reptiliomorphs, a group quite closely related to the amniotes, and paralleling some of their features. Like all advanced diadectids, Diasparactus was a herbivore, though not as large as its more well known relative Diadectes.

In Diasparactus, the spines of the dorsal vertebrae are higher than in other genera in the family.

== History ==
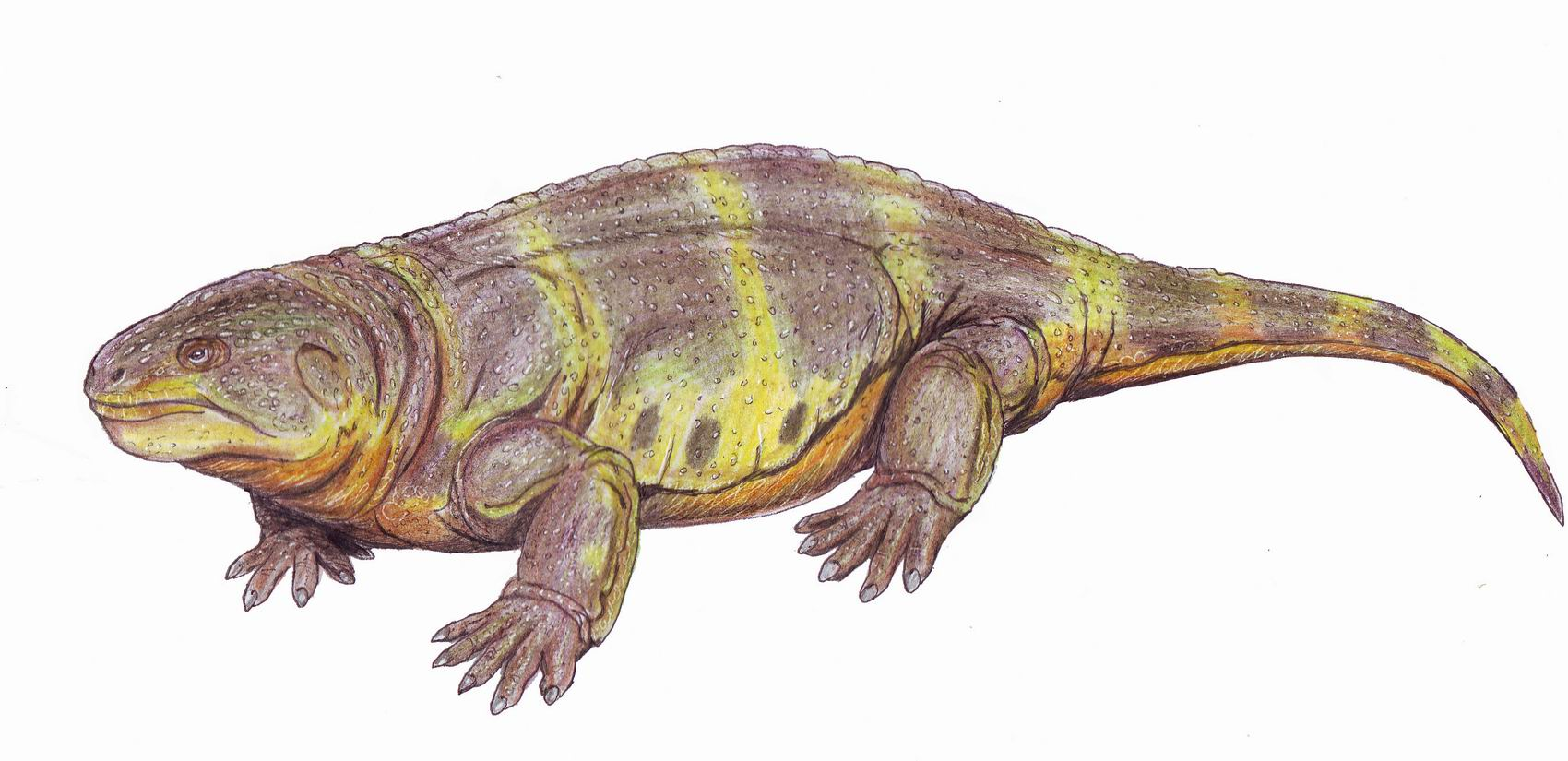
Life restoration of Diasparactus.

In 1910, E. C. Case described Diasparactus zenos from a few vertebrae found in New Mexico. In 1911, a largely intact skeleton was found in the same area. The vertebrae agreed with the described type species and the new find was considered likely to be the same species. The total length of the animal when restored was 1.35 metres.

== Description ==
The skull measured 16.7 centimetres. It was in poor condition but was similar to that of Diadectes lenius and Animasatirus carinatus. The nares and orbits were in similar positions and there were fourteen teeth with possibly a rudimentary fifteenth, a dentition typical of the family. The vertebrae, ribs and limbs were described in detail. The carpals were mostly present and still in position - the best preserved examples for a diadectid then found. The foot was broad and strong with short phalanges. The feet and limbs supported the view that this animal was a marsh-dweller and probably a slow-moving herbivore.
