= Desmatodon =

Desmatodon Temporal range: Late Carboniferous, Kasimovian

Scientific classification
- Kingdom: Animalia
- Phylum: Chordata
- Order: †Diadectomorpha
- Family: †Diadectidae
- Genus: †Desmatodon; Case, 1908

Species
- †D. hollandi Case, 1908 (type); †D. hesperis Vaughn, 1969

Extinct genus of tetrapods

Desmatodon is an extinct genus of diadectid reptiliomorph. With fossils found from the Kasimovian (Missourian) stage of the Late Carboniferous of Pennsylvania, Colorado, and New Mexico in the United States, Desmatodon is the oldest known diadectid, the group of the first known herbivorous tetrapods. Later members obtained larger sizes, with Desmatodon being somewhat smaller, though its actual size is unknown due to the fragmentary nature of the fossils. Two species are currently recognized: the type species D. hollandi and the species D. hesperis.

== Description ==
Remains of Desmatodon have been found from the Glenshaw Formation of Pennsylvania, the Sangre de Cristo Formation in Colorado, and the Cutler Formation of New Mexico. The genus is known mostly from teeth and portions of skulls. The cheek teeth are robust and spade-shaped with several cusps on their surfaces. The two species can be distinguished by the distribution of teeth in their jaws; D. hesperis has tightly packed teeth while D. hollandi has widely spaced teeth. In both species, the lower jaw is deep and possesses a ridge that may have aided in chewing plant material. Some specimens that are thought to belong to young individuals have fewer, more widely spaced teeth with no wear facets.

== Paleobiology ==
Like most other diadectids, Desmatodon was a terrestrial herbivore that consumed high-fiber plants. Protruding incisiform teeth and a large digestive tract may have allowed the animal to effectively consume and digest plant material. Being the oldest diadectid, Desmatodon also is the oldest known herbivorous land vertebrate.
