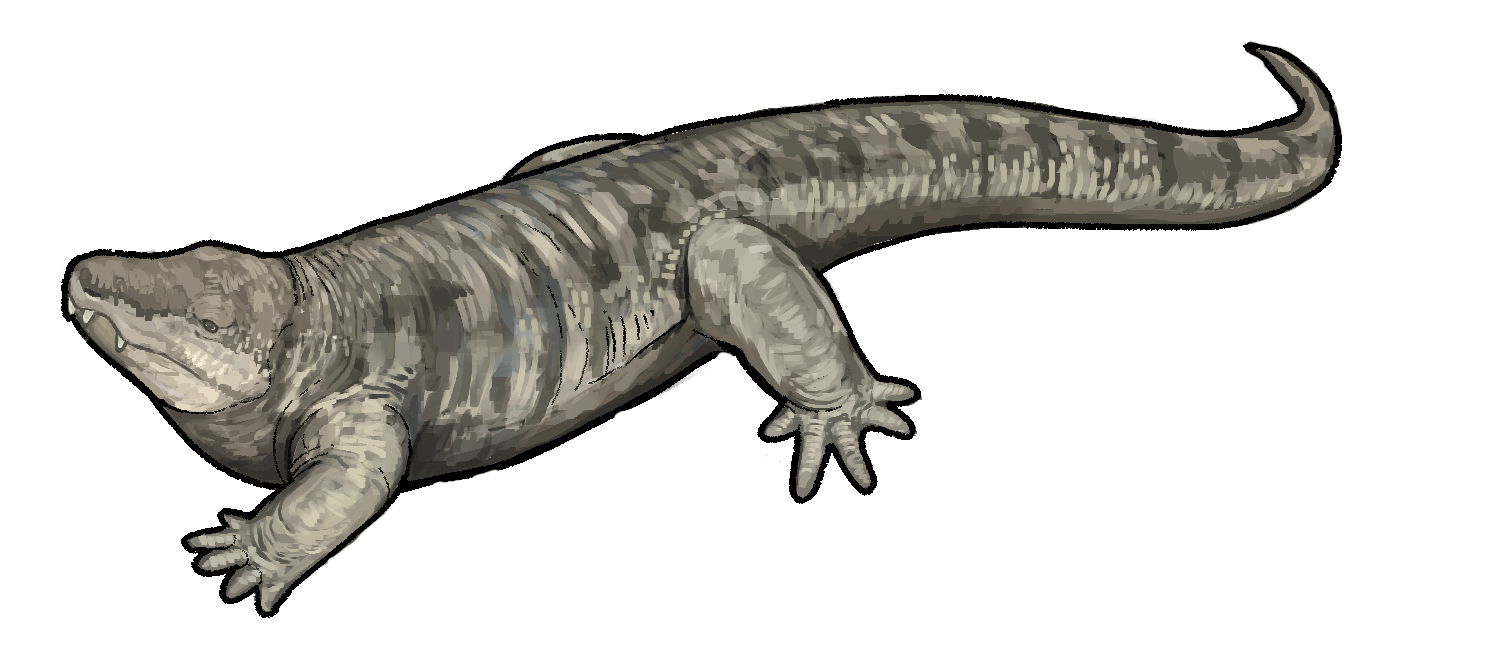
- Life restoration of Tseajaia campi

Scientific classification
- Kingdom: Animalia
- Phylum: Chordata
- Order: †Diadectomorpha
- Family: †Tseajaiidae; Vaughn, 1964
- Genus: †Tseajaia; Vaughn, 1964
- Species: †T. campi

Binomial name
- †Tseajaia campi Vaughn, 1964

= Tseajaia =

Tseajaia Temporal range: Early Permian

Extinct genus of tetrapods

Tseajaia is an extinct genus of diadectomorph tetrapod from the Early Permian of western North America. The skeleton is that of a medium-sized, rather advanced reptile-like animal. In life it was about 1 metre (3 ft) long and may have looked vaguely like an iguana. The dentition was somewhat blunt, indicating herbivory or possibly omnivory. It contains a single known species, Tseajaia campi.

== Discovery ==
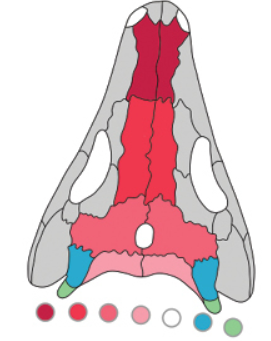
Skull of Tseajaia campi

The holotype of Tseajaia is a nearly complete skeleton, specimen UCMP V4225 / 59012, which is from the lowermost Organ Rock Shale or uppermost Cedar Mesa Sandstone. It was discovered by a field party led by Charles L. Camp working in San Juan County, Utah in June, 1942. The field work and the resulting discovery of Tseajaia was recorded in a 1942 article in Desert Magazine. A second specimen, UCMP V4216 / 63841, is a sequence of vertebrae from the same locality, also discovered by Camp's team. Two additional nearly complete skeletons, CM 38033 and CM 38042, were later discovered in the Cutler Formation of Rio Arriba County, New Mexico. The specimens from New Mexico were first reported in 1980, though they have yet to be fully described.

Tseajaia was named and described by Peter Paul Vaughn in 1964. The genus name comes from "Tse Ajai" ("Rock Heart"), a nearby igneous plug used as a landmark by the Navajo. The species name honors Charles L. Camp. It was subsequently redescribed by John Moss in 1972. The slab of rock containing the tail was lost between 1964 and 1972, though it was rediscovered by 1990.

== Classification ==
Tseajaia was described from a single, fairly complete specimen and was given its own family, Tseajaiidae, by Vaughn (1964). It was originally thought to be a seymouriamorph. Additional finds allowing for a better taxonomic analysis indicate they belong in the Diadectomorpha, as the sister group to the large and more derived Diadectidae. Tseajaia itself being a fairly generalized form, gives a reasonable indication of the build and looks of the closest relatives of the amniotes.
