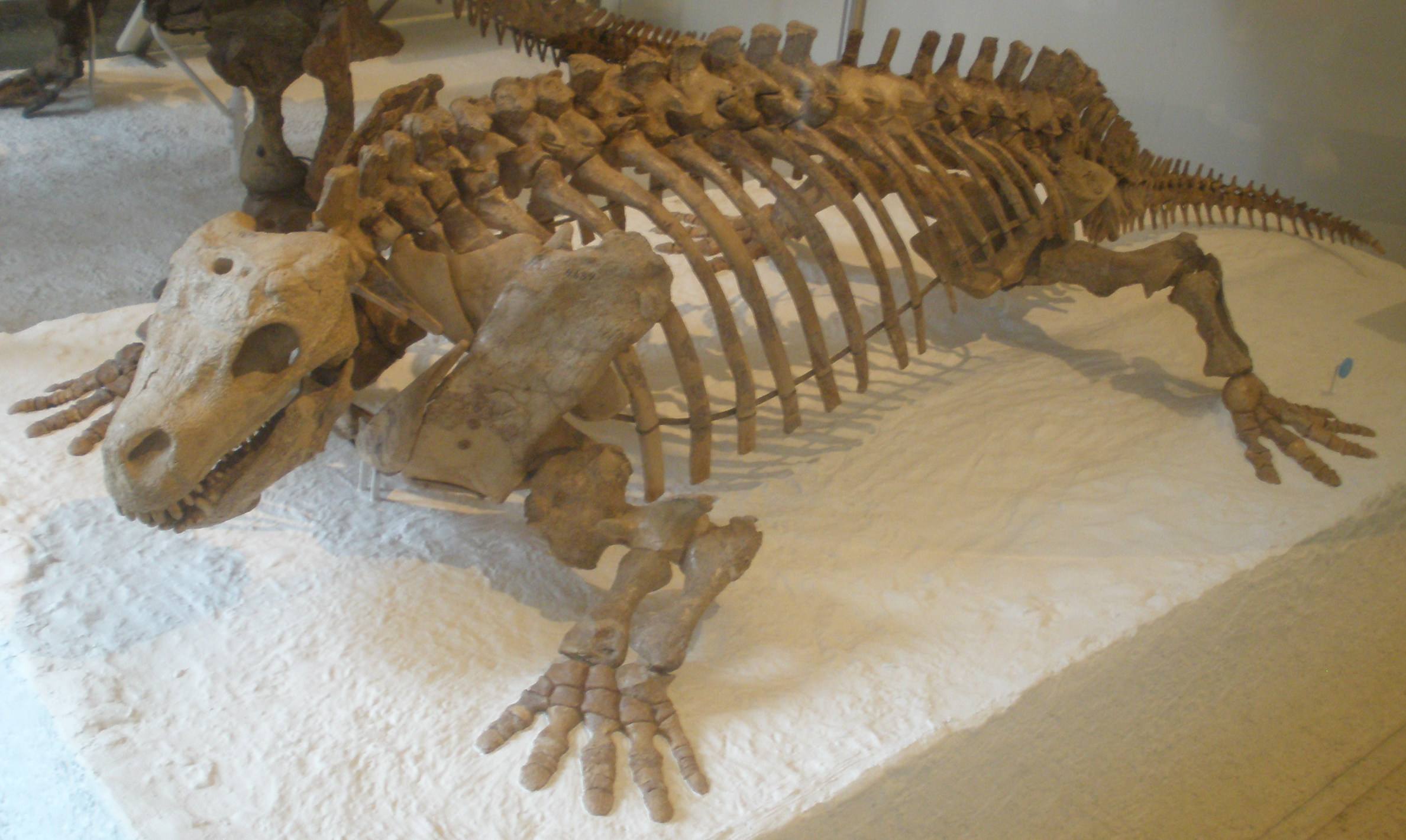
- Skeleton of Diadectes sideropelicus in the American Museum of Natural History
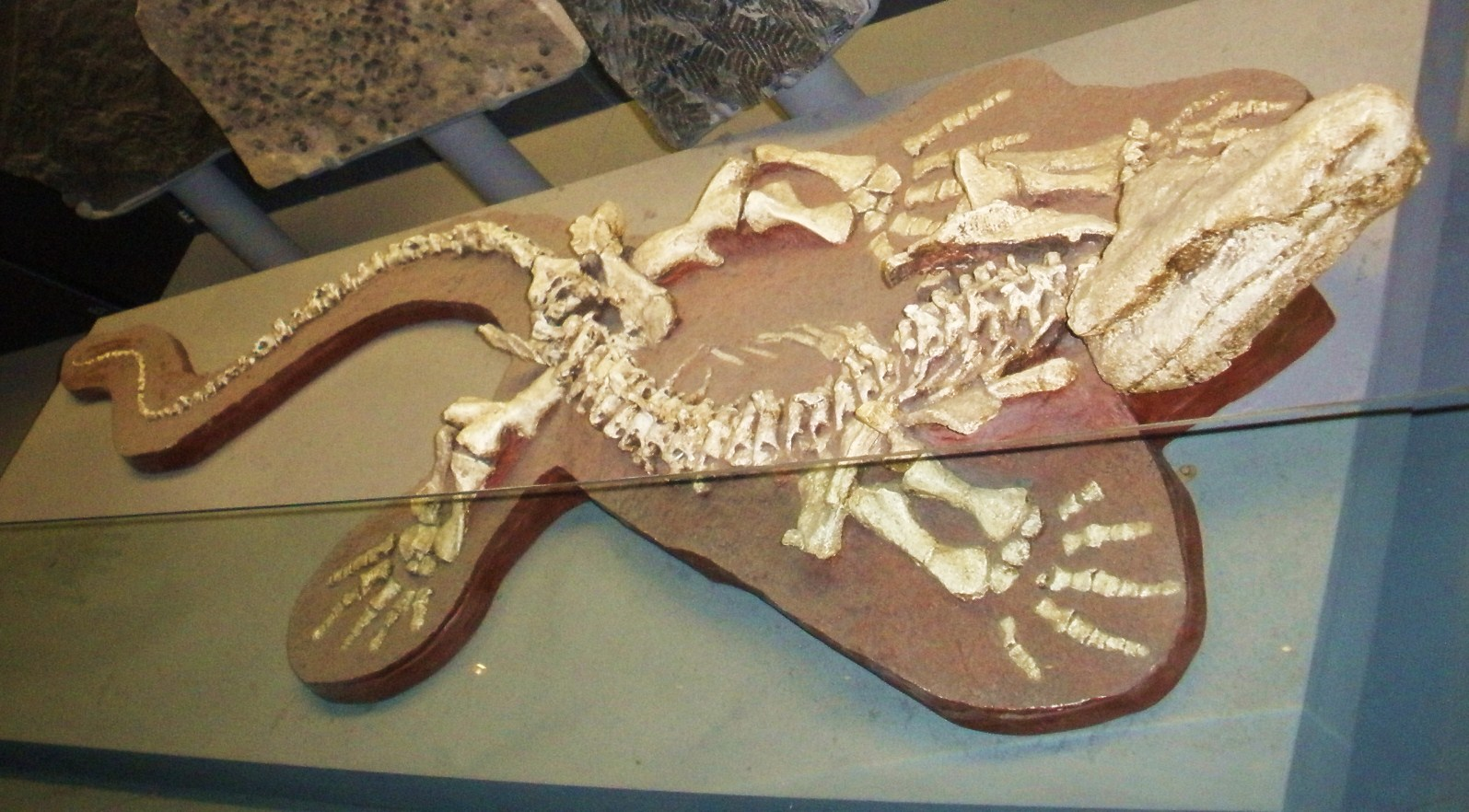
- Skeleton of Limnoscelis paludis

Scientific classification
- Kingdom: Animalia
- Phylum: Chordata
- Clade: Reptiliomorpha
- Order: †Diadectomorpha; Watson, 1917

Subgroups
- †Diadectidae; †Limnoscelidae; †Tseajaiidae

= Diadectomorpha =

Diadectomorphs Temporal range: Late Carboniferous–Wuchiapingian

Extinct clade of tetrapods

Diadectomorpha is a clade of large tetrapods that lived in Euramerica during the Carboniferous and Early Permian periods and in Asia during Late Permian (Wuchiapingian), They have typically been classified as advanced reptiliomorphs (transitional between "amphibians" sensu lato and amniotes) positioned close to, but outside of the clade Amniota, though some recent research has recovered them as the sister group to the traditional Synapsida within Amniota, based on inner ear anatomy and cladistic analyses. They include both large (up to 2 meters long) carnivorous and even larger (to 3 meters) herbivorous forms, some semi-aquatic and others fully terrestrial. The diadectomorphs seem to have originated during late Mississippian times, although they only became common after the Carboniferous rainforest collapse and flourished during the Late Pennsylvanian and Early Permian periods.

== Anatomy ==
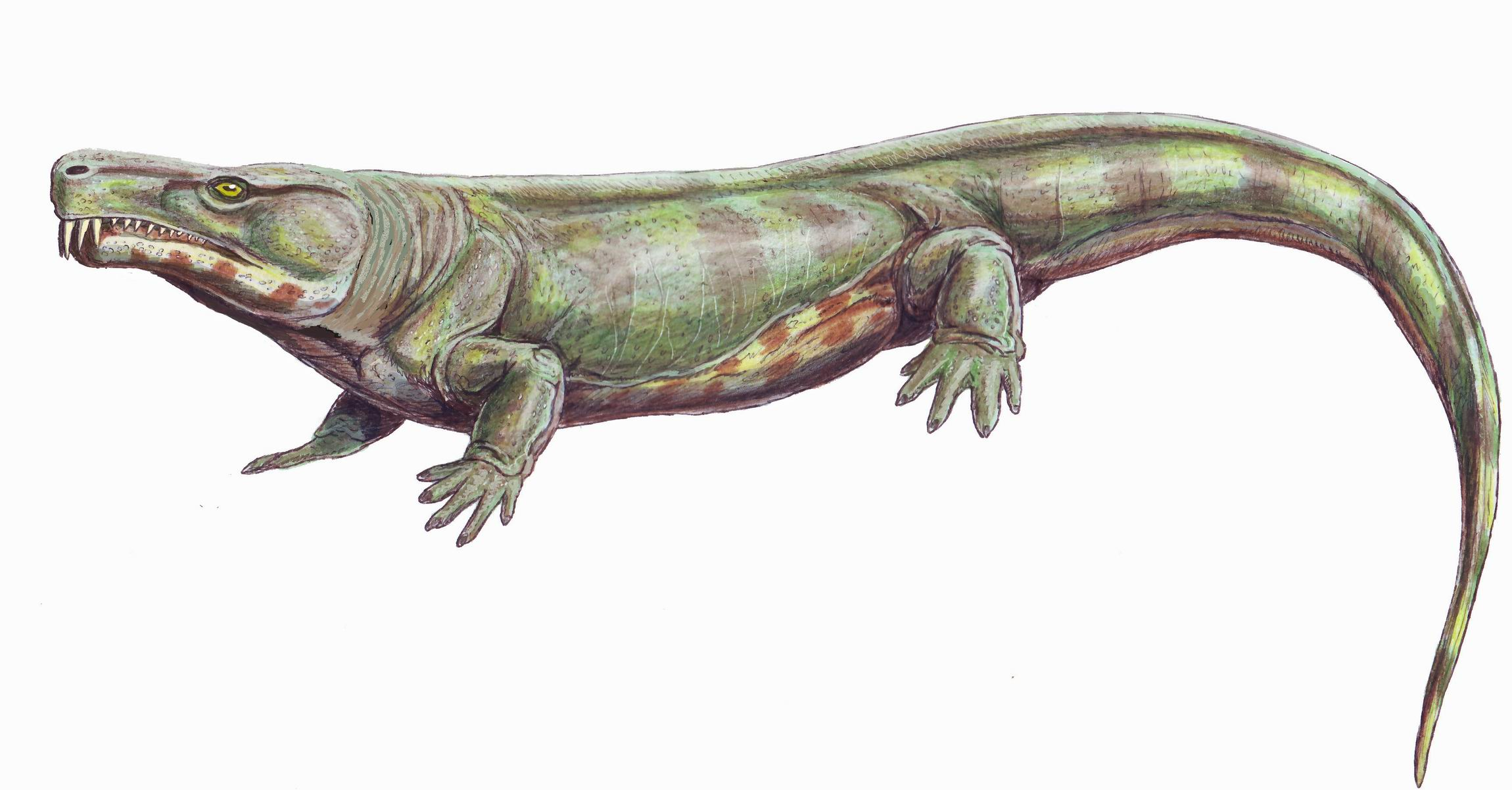
Life restoration of Limnoscelis

Diadectomorphs possessed both amphibian-like and amniote-like characteristics. Originally these animals were included under the order Cotylosauria, and were considered the most primitive and ancestral lineage of reptiles. More recently they have been reclassified either as non-amniote reptiliomorphs lying just outside the clade Amniota, or as early-diverging synapsids (members of the amniote group containing mammals and their extinct relatives). Contrary to other non-amniote reptiliomorphs, the teeth of the Diadectomorpha lacked the infolding of the dentine and enamel that account for the name Labyrinthodontia for the non-amniote tetrapods. Foot impressions of diadectids indicate that their skin covering was made of epidermal scales similar to those of living reptiles. However, foot impressions of limnoscelids and diadectids suggest that they lacked the keratinous claws found in living reptiles and other amniotes.

== Classification ==
Diadectomorpha is most commonly given the rank of order when formal taxonomic ranks are applied. It is further divided into three families, representing specialization into different ecological niches. The exact phylogenetic relationship between the three is disputed.

- The family Diadectidae is perhaps the best known group, comprising medium to large herbivores. Early members were low-slung, but the latter Diadectes (from which the whole group take its name) evolved strong, if sprawling legs, paralleling the anatomy of early herbivorous reptiles. The teeth were chisel-like and lacked the typical labyrinthodont infolding of the enamel. Diadectids were distributed over most of the Northern parts of Pangaea.
- The family Limnoscelidae contained large carnivores or piscivores. The largest genus, Limnoscelis could grow to at least 1.5 meters. The family had pointed and slightly curved teeth with labyrinthodont enamel. Distribution seem to have been restricted to North America.
- The family Tseajaiidae, known from a single specimen from North America, were medium-sized, generalized reptiliomorphs. They had blunt teeth and appear to be primarily herbivorous or omnivorous. The known specimen would have been on the order of a meter (3 ft.) long.

Below is a cladogram modified from the 2010 analysis:

- Diadectomorpha
  - Limnoscelidae
  - - Tseajaiidae
    - Diadectidae 305 mya
      - Ambedus pusillus?
      - - Oradectes sanmiguelensis
        - - Orobates pabsti
          - - Alveusdectes fenestralis
            - Desmatodon hesperis
            - - Silvadectes absitus
              - - Diadectes tenuitectes
                - Diadectes sideropelicus
                - Diasparactus zenos

== Reproduction and the origin of Amniota ==
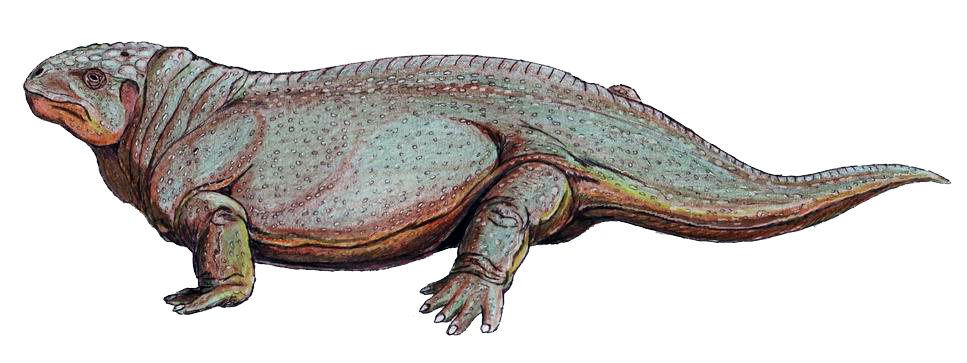
Life restoration of Diadectes

The reproduction of the diadectomorphs has been the matter of some debate. If their group lay within the Amniota as has at times been assumed, they would have laid an early version of the amniote egg. Current thinking favours the amniote egg being evolved in very small animals, like Westlothiana or Casineria, leaving the bulky diadectomorphs just on the amphibian side of the divide.

This would indicate the large and bulky diadectomorphs laid anamniote eggs (in water). However, no unambiguously diadectomorph tadpole is known. Whether this is due to an actual lack of tadpole stage or taphonomy (many diadectomorphs were upland creatures where tadpoles would have a poor probability of being fossilized) is uncertain. Alfred Romer indicated that the anamniote/amniote divide might not have been very sharp, leaving the question of the actual mode of reproduction of these large animals unanswered. Possible reproductive modes include full amphibian spawning with aquatic tadpoles, internal fertilization with or without ovoviviparity, aquatic eggs with direct development or some combination of these. The reproductive mode might also have varied within the group.

Lee and Spencer (1997) argued diadectomorphs probably laid amniote eggs because their adaptations to feed on terrestrial plants rich on fiber mean they were adapted to a niche not seen in unambiguous 'amphibians', and would have required an early acquisition of terrestrial endosymbionts necessary for this diet that supposedly could not have happened if young diadectomorphs were aquatic larvae.

David Berman (2013) ran a phylogenetic analysis, and in this study the analysis resulted in Diadectomorpha being inside amniota as a sister taxon to Synapsida.
