= List of pelycosaurs =

This list of pelycosaurs is an attempt to create a comprehensive listing of all genera that have ever been included in the synapsida excluding therapsida and purely vernacular terms. The list includes all commonly accepted genera, but also genera that are now considered invalid, doubtful (nomina dubia), or were not formally published (nomina nuda), as well as junior synonyms of more established names, and genera that are no longer considered pelycosaurs.

The list currently contains 83 generic names.

== Naming conventions and terminology ==
Naming conventions and terminology follow the International Code of Zoological Nomenclature. Technical terms used include:

- Junior synonym: A name which describes the same taxon as a previously published name. If two or more genera are formally designated and the type specimens are later assigned to the same genus, the first to be published (in chronological order) is the senior synonym, and all other instances are junior synonyms. Senior synonyms are generally used, except by special decision of the ICZN, but junior synonyms cannot be used again, even if deprecated. Junior synonymy is often subjective, unless the genera described were both based on the same type specimen.
- Nomen nudum (Latin for "naked name"): A name that has appeared in print but has not yet been formally published by the standards of the ICZN. Nomina nuda (the plural form) are invalid, and are therefore not italicized as a proper generic name would be. If the name is later formally published, that name is no longer a nomen nudum and will be italicized on this list. Often, the formally published name will differ from any nomina nuda that describe the same specimen.
- Nomen oblitum (Latin for "forgotten name"): A name that has not been used in the scientific community for more than fifty years after its original proposal.
- Preoccupied name: A name that is formally published, but which has already been used for another taxon. This second use is invalid (as are all subsequent uses) and the name must be replaced. As preoccupied names are not valid generic names, they will also go unitalicized on this list.
- Nomen dubium (Latin for "dubious name"): A name describing a fossil with no unique diagnostic features. As this can be an extremely subjective and controversial designation, this term is not used on this list.

== List ==
Genus	Authors	Year	Status	Age	Location	Notes
Aerosaurus	Romer	1937	Valid.	Late Carboniferous - Lower Permian	United States of America	
Angelosaurus	Olson; Beerbower	1953	Valid.	Upper Permian	United States of America	
Anglosaurus	Bruner	1991	Sic	N/A	N/A	Incorrect spelling for Angelosaurus
Apsisaurus	Laurin	1991	Valid.	Lower Permian	United States of America	Formerly assigned as a "eosuchian" diapsid.
Archaeobelus	Cope	1877	Syn.	N/A	N/A	Synonym of Clepsydrops
Archaeothyris	Reisz	1972	Valid.	Upper Carboniferous	United States of America	
Archaeovenator	Reisz; Dilkes	2003	Valid.	Upper Carboniferous	United States of America	
Arribasaurus	Williston	1914	Syn.	N/A	N/A	Synonym of Ophiacodon
Baldwinonus	Romer; Price	1940	Valid.	Late Carboniferous - Early Permian	United States of America	
Basicranodon	Vaughn	1958	Syn.	Lower Permian	United States of America	Synonym of Mycterosaurus
Bathyglyptus	Case	1911	Syn.	N/A	N/A	Synonym of Dimetrodon
Bathygnathus	Leidy	1854	Valid.	Lower Permian	United States of America	
Brachycnemius	Williston	1911	Syn.	N/A	N/A	Synonym of Edaphosaurus
Callibrachion	Boule; Glangeau	1893	Syn.	N/A	N/A	Synonym of Haptodus
Casea	Williston	1910	Valid.	Lower Permian	France and United States of America	
Caseoides	Olson; Beerbower	1953	Valid.	Lower Permian	United States of America	
Caseopsis	Olson	1962	Valid.	Upper Permian	United States of America	
Clepsydrops	Cope	1875	Valid.	Late Carboniferous	United States of America	
Colobomycter	Vaughn	1958	Valid.	Lower Permian	United States of America	It is a protorothyridid eureptile
Cotylorhynchus	Stovall	1937	Valid.	Lower Permian	United States of America	
Cryptovenator	Fröbisch; Schoch; Müller; Schindler; Schweiss	2011	Valid.	Late Carboniferous	Germany	
Ctenorhachis	Hook; Hotton	1991	Valid.	Upper Permian	United States of America	
Ctenospondylus	Romer	1936	Valid.	Lower Permian	United States	
Cutleria	Lewis; Vaughn	1965	Valid.	Early Permian	United States of America	
Delorhynchus	Fox	1962	Valid.	Lower Permian	United States of America	Originally descript as a pelycosaur, but probably a parareptile
Datheosaurus	Schroeder	1905	Syn.	N/A	N/A	Synonym of Haptodus
Dimacrodon	Olson; Beerbower	1953	Valid?	Lower Permian	United States	Originally descript as an anomodont therapsid by Olson & Beerbower (1953) and Olson (1962), it lacks any diagnostic features of anomodonts and rather represent pelycosaur-grade synapsids
Dimetrodon	Cope	1878	Valid.	Early Permian - Middle Permian	United States of America and Germany	
Diopaeus	Cope	1892	Syn.	N/A	N/A	Synonym of Ophiacodon
Echinerpeton	Reisz	1972	Valid.	Upper Carboniferous	Canada	
Edaphosaurus	Cope	1882	Valid.	Late Carboniferous - Lower Permian	Czech Republic and United States of America	
Elcabrosaurus	Case	1907	Syn.	N/A	N/A	Synonym of Sphenacodon
Elliotsmithia	Broom	1937	Valid.	Middle-Upper Permian	South Africa	
Embolophorus	Cope	1878	Syn.	N/A	N/A	Synonym of Dimetrodon
Ennatosaurus	Efremov	1956	Valid.	Lower Permian	Russia	
Eothyris	Romer	1937	Valid.	Lower Permian	United States of America	
Eumatthevia	Broom	1930	Syn.	N/A	N/A	Synonym of Mycterosaurus
Euromycter	Reisz; Maddin; Fröbisch; Falconnet	2011	Valid.	Early-Late Permian	France	
Glaucosaurus	Williston	1915	Valid.	Lower Permian	United States of America	
Haptodus	Gaudry	1866	Valid.	Late Carboniferous - Lower Permian	United States of America and Europe	
Heleosaurus	Broom	1907	Valid.	Upper Permian	South Africa	
Ianthasaurus	Reisz; Berman	1986	Valid.	Late Carboniferous	United States of America	
Ianthodon	Kissel; Reisz	2004	Valid.	Upper Carboniferous	United States of America	
Ianthosaurus	Reisz; Berman	1986	Sic	N/A	N/A	Incorrect spelling of Ianthasaurus
Lupeosaurus	Romer	1937	Valid.	Lower Permian	United States of America	
Macromerion	Fritsch	1879	Valid.	Upper Carboniferous	Germany	
Mesenosaurus	Efremov	1938	Valid.	Lower Permian	Russia	
Mesonosaurus	Ivakhnenko; Kurzanov	1979	Sic	N/A	N/A	Incorrect spelling of Mesenosaurus
Milosaurus	DeMar	1970	Valid.	Upper Carboniferous	United States of America	
Mycterosaurus	Williston	1915	Valid.	Lower Permian	United States of America	
Naosaurus	Cope	1886	Syn.	N/A	N/A	Synonym of Edaphosaurus
Neosaurus	Nopsca	1923	Valid.	Lower Permian	France	
Nitosaurus	Romer	1937	Valid.	Lower Permian	United States of America	
Oedaleops	Langston	1965	Valid.	Lower Permian	United States of America	
Ophiacodon	Marsh	1878	Valid.	Late Carboniferous-Lower Permian	United States of America and England	
Oromycter	Reisz	2005	Valid.	Lower Permian	United States of America	
Oxyodon	Huene	1908	Preocc.	N/A	N/A	Preoccupied by fish genus Oxyodon Brauer, 1906. Synonym of Sphenacodon
Palaeohatteria	Credner	1888	Valid.	Early Permian	Germany	
Palaeosphenodon	Baur	1889	Syn.	N/A	N/A	Synonym of Palaeohatteria
Pantelosaurus	von Huene	1925	Valid.	Early Permian	Germany	
Phreatophasma	Efremov	1954	Valid.	Middle Permian	Russia	
Poecilospondylus	Case	1910	Syn.	N/A	N/A	Synonym of Varanosaurus
Poliosaurus	Case	1907	Syn.	N/A	N/A	Synonym of Ophiacodon
Protoclepsydrops	Carroll	1964	Valid.	Upper Carboniferous	Canada	
Pyozia	Anderson; Reisz	2004	Valid.	Middle Permian	Russia	
Ruthenosaurus	Reisz; Maddin; Fröbisch; Falconnet	2011	Valid.	Early-Late Permian	France	
Ruthiromia	Eberth; Brinkman	1983	Valid.	Lower Permian	United States of America	
Scoliomus	Williston; Case	1915	Syn.	Lower Permian	United States of America	Junior synonym of Sphenacodon
Secodontosaurus	Romer	1936	Valid.	Lower Permian	United States of America	
Sphenacodon	Marsh	1878	Valid.	Late Carboniferous-Early Permian	United States of America and England	
Stereophallodon	Romer	1937	Valid.	Late Carboniferous-Early Permian	United States of America	
Stereorhachis	Gaudry	1880	Valid.	Late Carboniferous	France	
Theropleura	Cope	1878	Syn.	N/A	N/A	Synonym of Ophiacodon (in partium) and Dimetrodon (in partium)
Therosaurus	von Huene	1925	Syn.	N/A	N/A	Synonym of Ophiacodon
Thrausmosaurus	Fox	1962	Valid.	Lower Permian	United States of America	The type species, T. serratidens, was declared to be a nomen dubium
Trichasaurus	Williston	1913	Valid.	Lower Permian	United States of America	Replacement name for Trispondylus Williston, 1910
Trispondylus	Williston	1910	Preocc.	N/A	N/A	Preoccupied by phenacodontid Trispondylus Cope, 1884
Varanodon	Olson	1965	Valid.	Lower Permian	United States of America	
Varanops	Williston	1911	Valid.	Lower Permian	United States of America	
Varanosaurus	Broili	1904	Valid.	Lower Permian	United States of America	
Xyrospondylus	Reisz; Heaton; Pynn	1982	Valid.	Upper Carboniferous	United States of America	
Watongia	Olson	1974	Valid.	Middle Permian	United States of America	
Winfeldia	Romer	1925	Syn.	N/A	N/A	Synonym of Ophiacodon

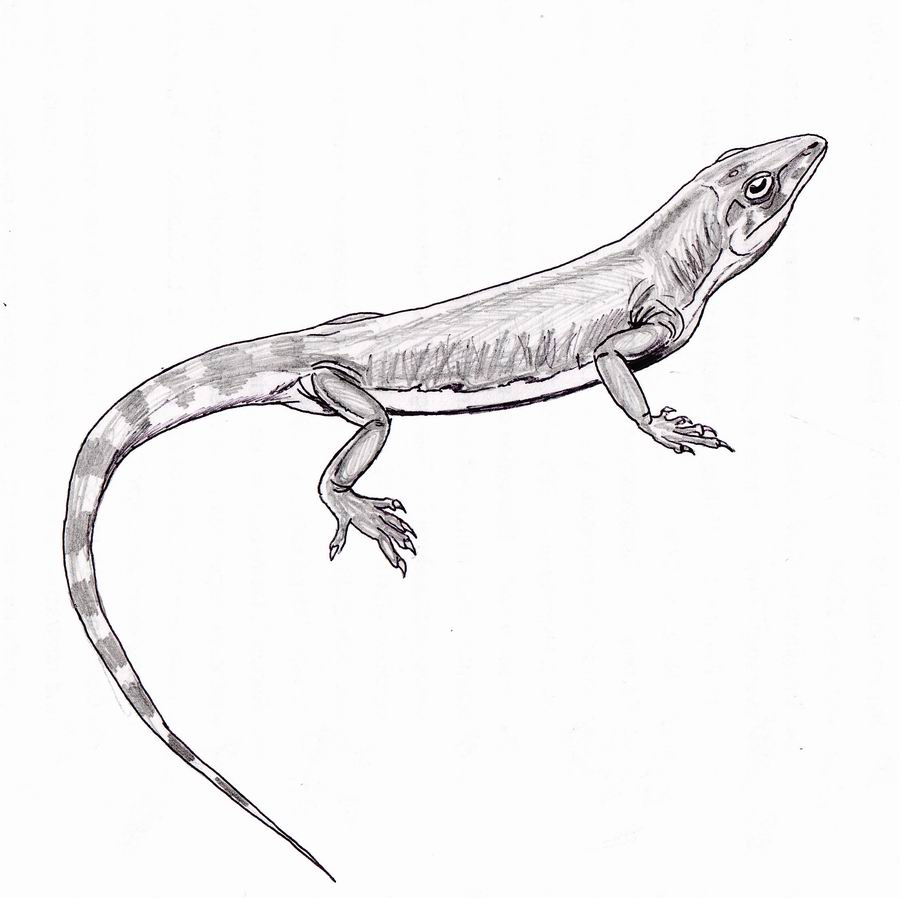
Archaeovenator

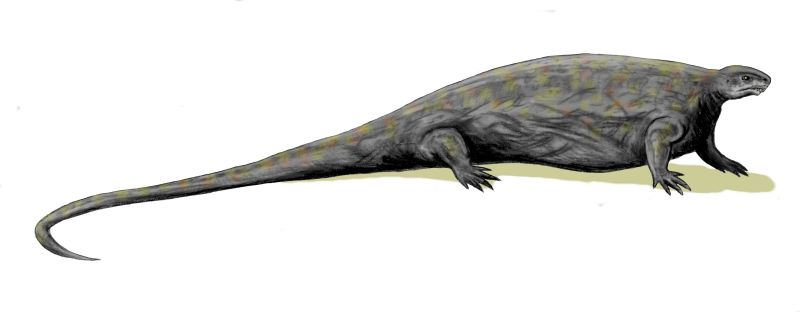
Casea

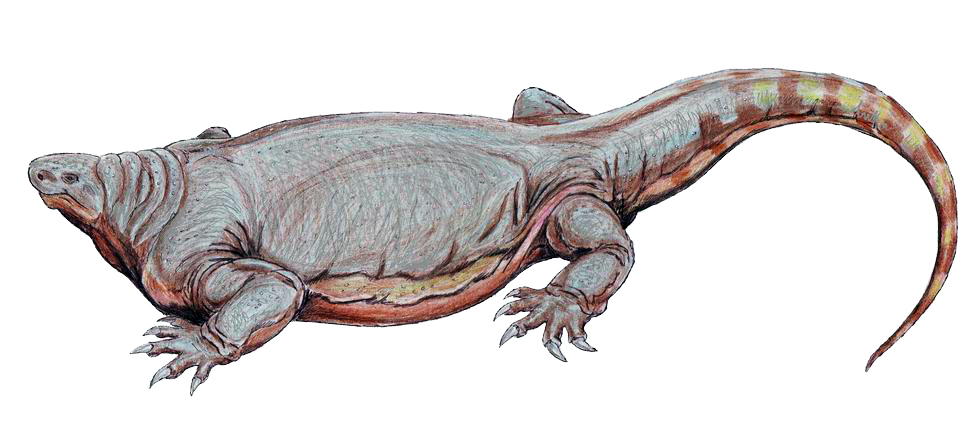
Cotylorhynchus

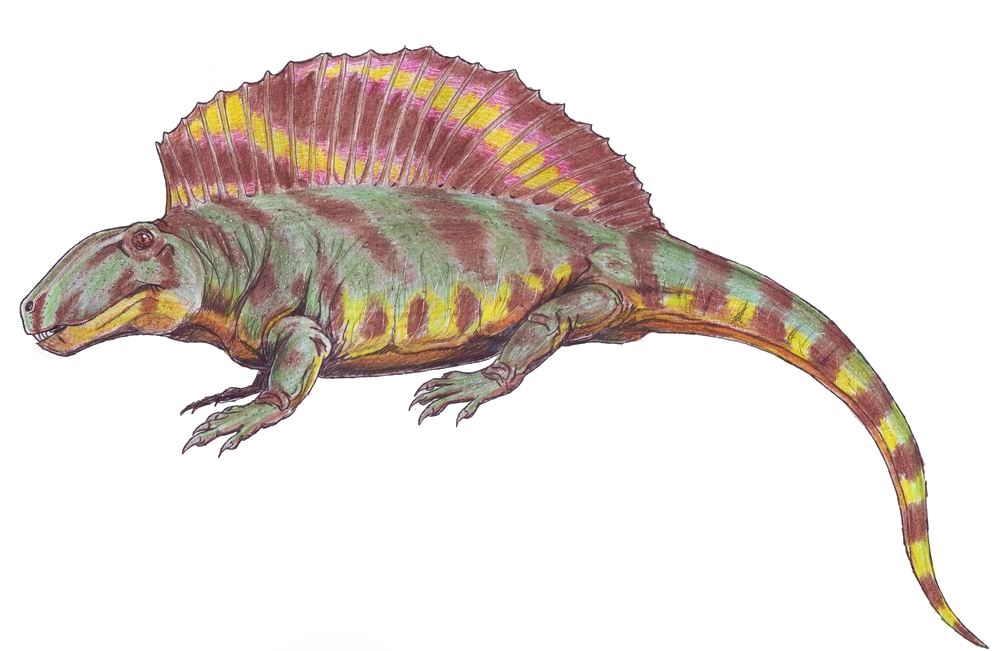
Ctenospondylus

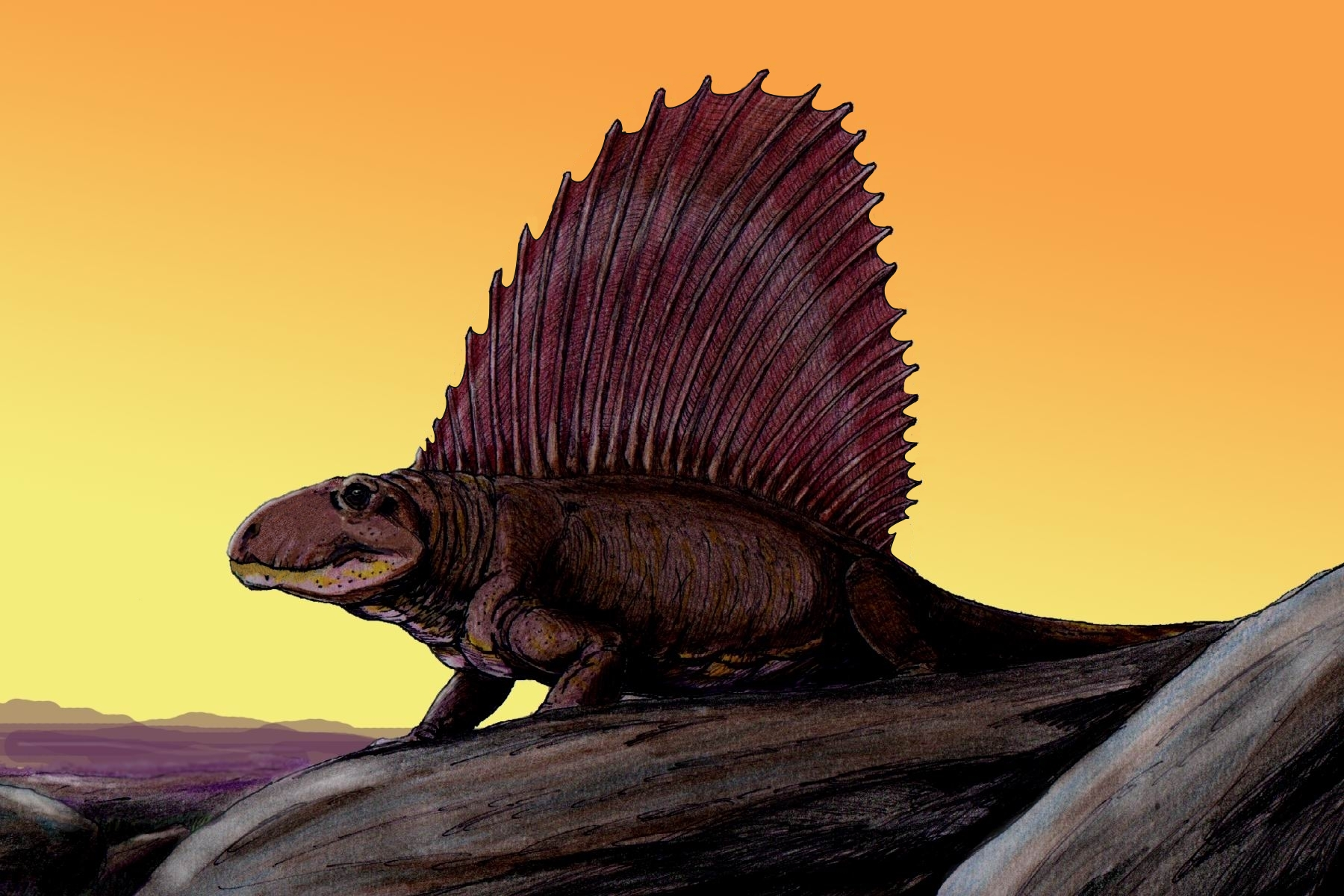
Dimetrodon

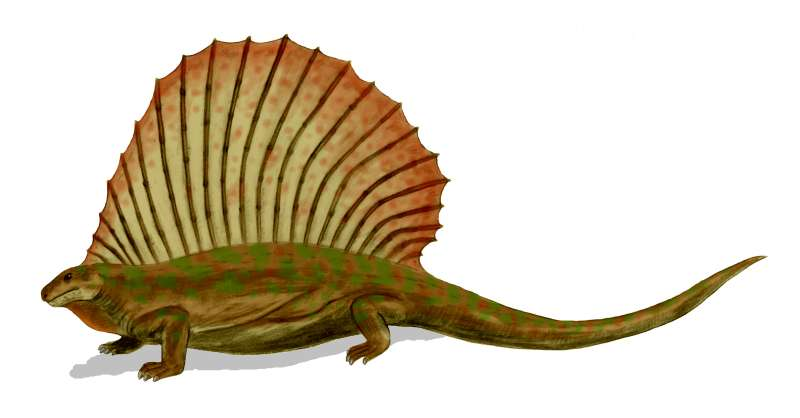
Edaphosaurus

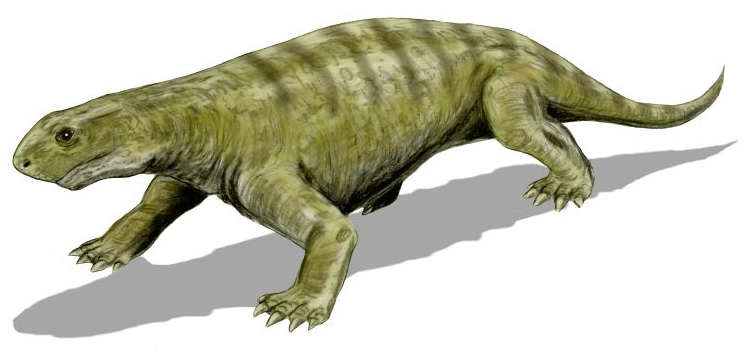
Ennatosaurus

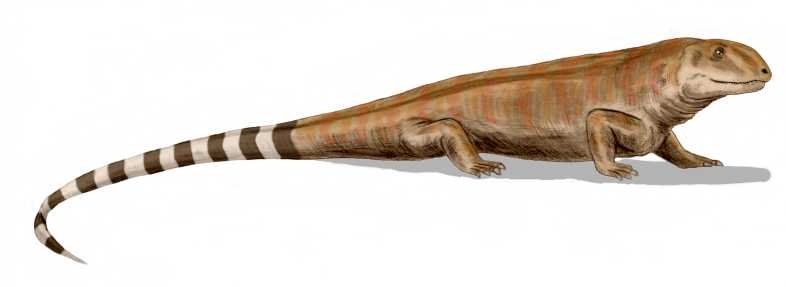
Haptodus

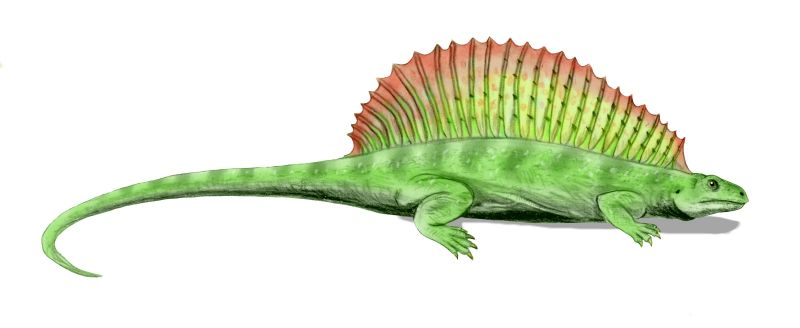
Ianthasaurus

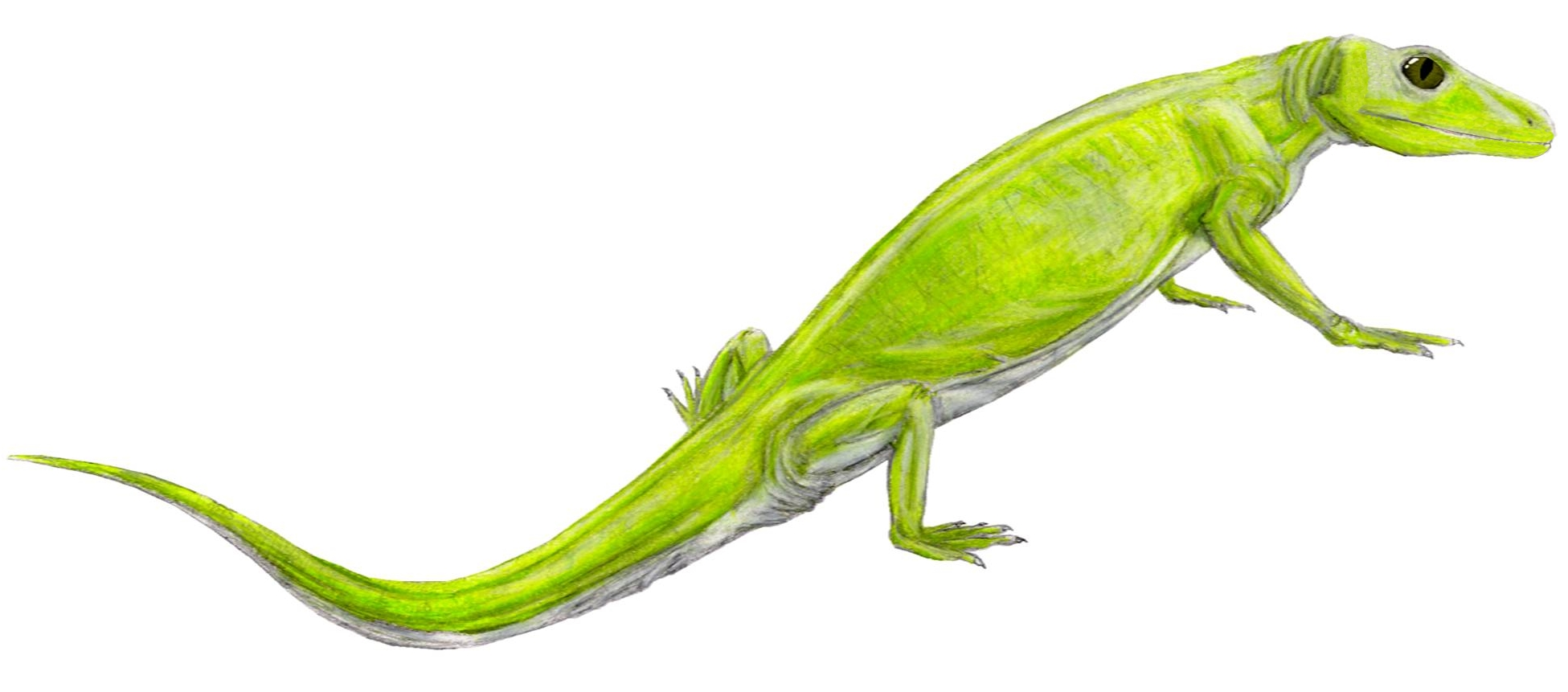
Mycterosaurus

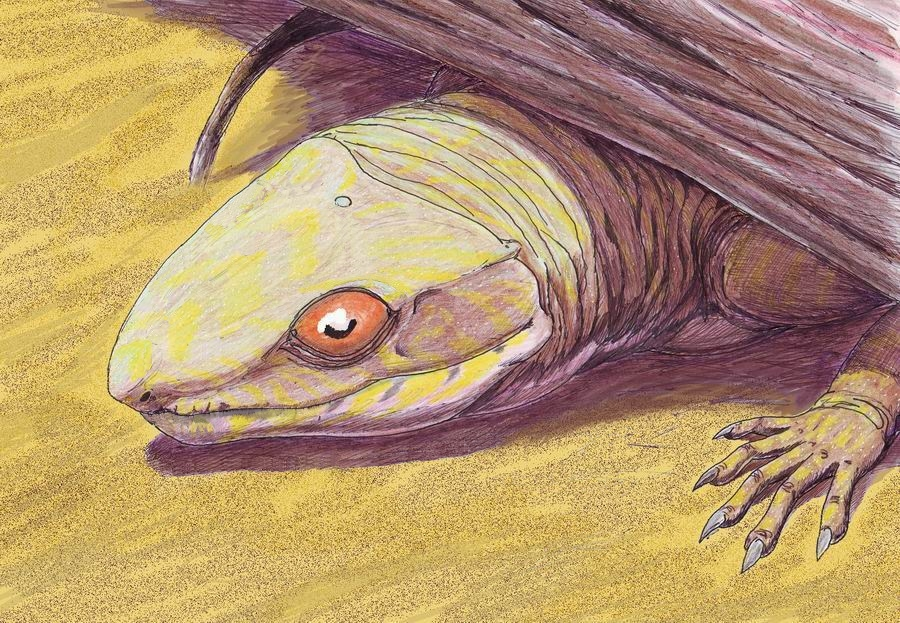
Oedaleops

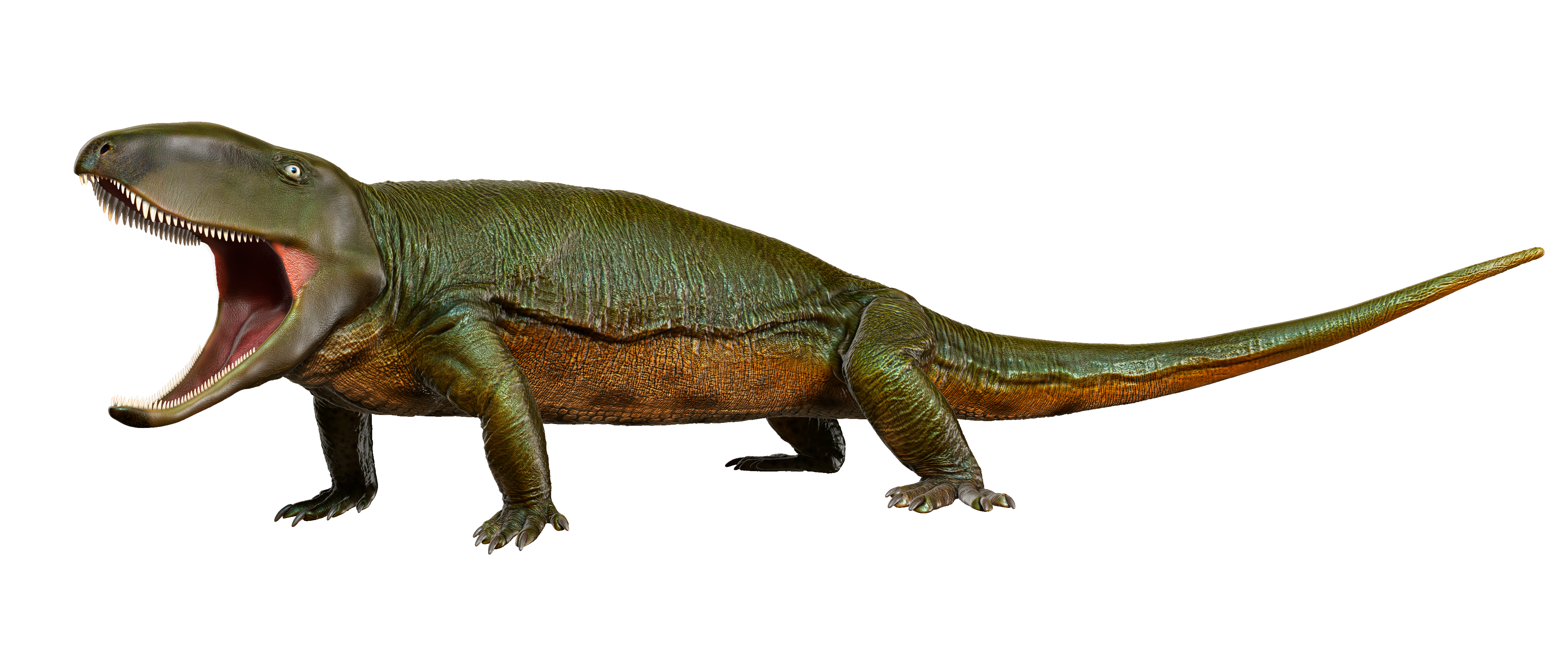
Ophiacodon

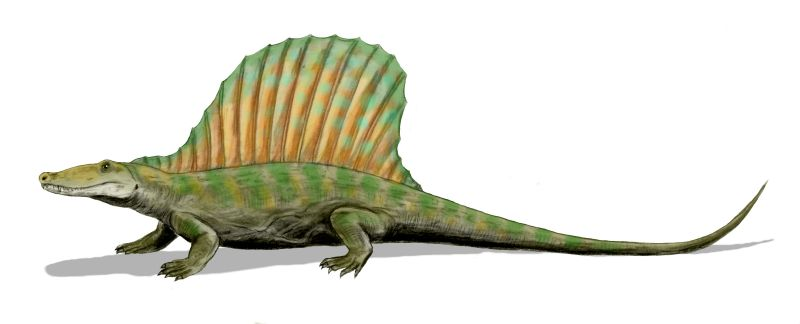
Secodontosaurus

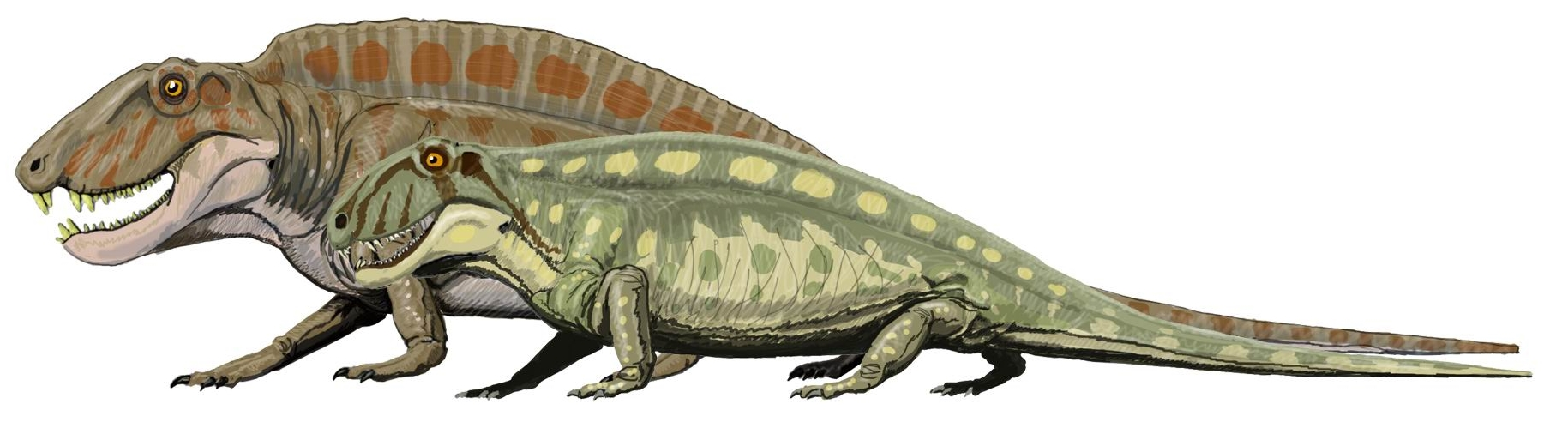
Sphenacodon

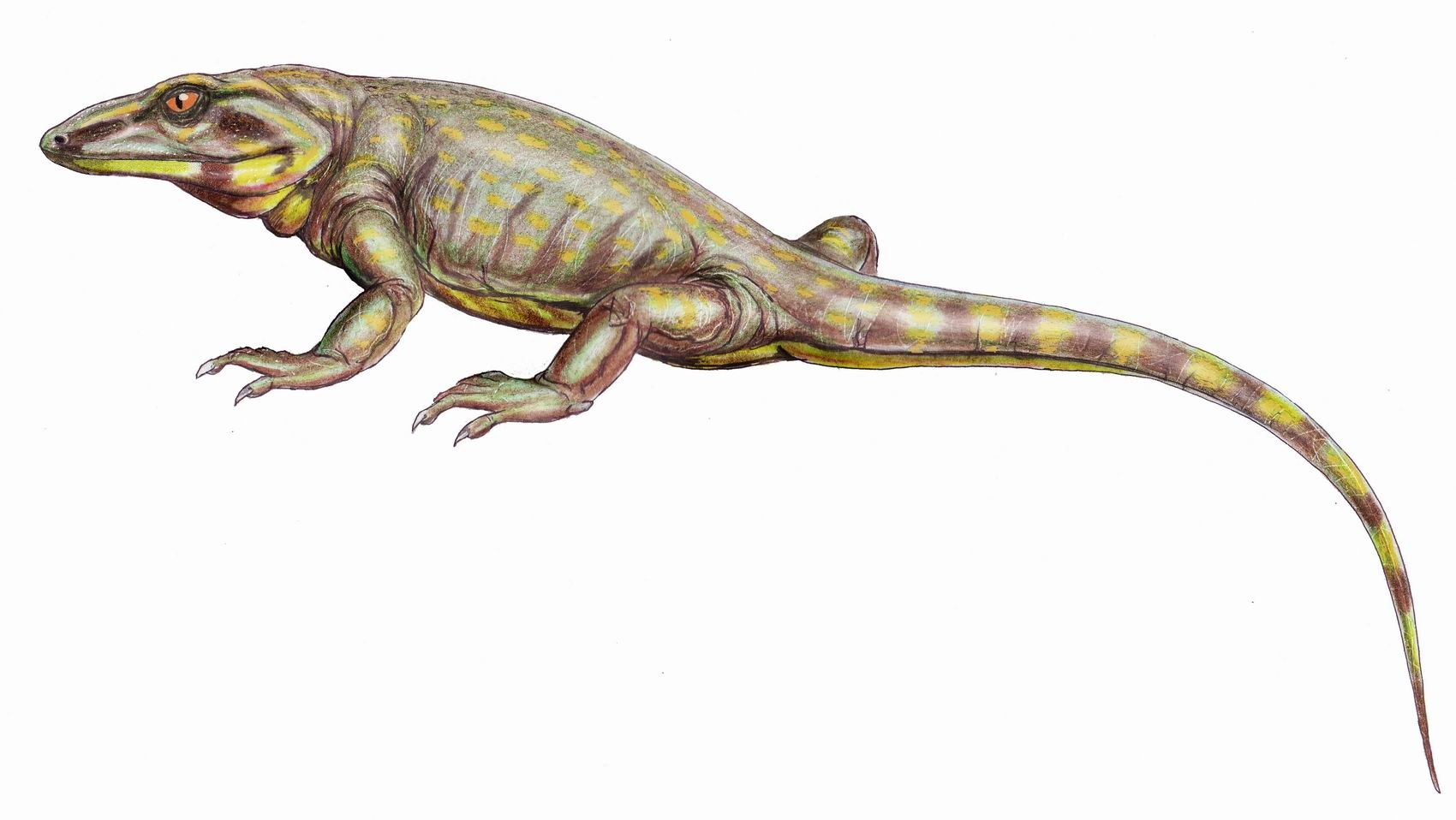
Varanodon

== See also ==
- List of prehistoric mammals
- List of therapsids
- Synapsid
