= Baldwinonus =

Baldwinonus Temporal range: Early Permian, Asselian

Scientific classification
- Domain: Eukaryota
- Kingdom: Animalia
- Phylum: Chordata
- Clade: Synapsida
- Family: †Ophiacodontidae
- Genus: †Baldwinonus; Romer and Price, 1940

Species
- †B. trux Romer and Price, 1940 (type); †?B. dunkardensis Romer, 1952

Extinct genus of synapsids

Baldwinonus is an extinct genus of basal synapsids from the Early Permian. The type species is Baldwinonus trux, named in 1940 from the Cutler Formation of New Mexico. A second species, Baldwinonus dunkardensis, was named in 1952 from Ohio. Baldwinonus was first classified in the family Eothyrididae, but the group has since been recognized as a wastebasket taxon for many early synapsids. More recently, Baldwinonus has been placed in the family Ophiacodontidae. Its phylogenetic relationship to other early synapsids remains poorly understood because it is only known from a few fragments of bone.

== Description ==
Baldwinonus trux is known from a fragment of a right maxilla or upper jaw bone, part of a quadrate bone, and several vertebrae. The maxilla contains 25 tooth sockets, some with teeth. There are sockets for five precaniniform teeth at the front of the jaw, two caniniform teeth behind them, and eight postcaniniform teeth at the back of the jaw. The margin of the jaw is straight for most of its length but curves upward toward the front tip. The large caniniform teeth in B. trux were initially taken as evidence for its placement within Eothyrididae, since large teeth are one of the most distinctive features of the eothyridid Eothyris. However, Eothyris only has one precanine tooth on each side of the jaw, and is probably not closely related to Baldwinonus trux. A buttress of bone runs along the inside of the jaw above the sockets of the caniniform teeth, strengthening the jaw. This buttress extends upward like a flap to form a sharp ridge, a feature that Baldwinonus shares with a group of early synapsids called Ophiacodontidae. A groove of bone that presumably made space for a blood vessel runs horizontally along the inner surface of the jaw but turns downward near the buttress. In other groups of early synapsids such as Sphenacodontinae the buttress does not form a flap but grades smoothly with the surface of the jaw above it, and the groove for the blood vessel continues running horizontally onto the surface of the buttress.

Baldwinonus trux is very similar in appearance to another poorly known synapsid called Stereophallodon. Both have nearly identical vertebrae and maxillary bones. The only difference between the two is that the edge of the maxilla that contacts the palatine bone ends behind the caniniform tooth buttress in Baldwinonus and ends on the buttress in Stereophallodon. In their description of the two synapsids, Brinkman and Eberth (1986) considered Baldwinonus and Stereophallodon to be closely related members of the family Ophiacodontidae. Some characteristics of the centrum or central part of the vertebra were interpreted as primitive characteristics of synapsids in general, and large caniniform teeth were taken as evidence that the two taxa were primitive among ophiacodontids as well.

Baldwinonus dunkardensis is also known from a maxilla. Like B. trux, it has two large canines with a buttress running above them. Unlike B. trux, B. dunkardensis has only one precanine tooth and its maxilla is about half the size. In this respect it is more similar to eothyridids like Eothyris and Oedaleops than it is to B. trux or ophiacodontids.
