= Clepsydrops =

Clepsydrops Temporal range: Carboniferous
- Life restoration

Scientific classification
- Domain: Eukaryota
- Kingdom: Animalia
- Phylum: Chordata
- Clade: Synapsida
- Family: †Ophiacodontidae
- Genus: †Clepsydrops; Cope, 1875

Species
- †Clepsydrops collettii; †Clepsydrops natalis; †Clepsydrops vinslovii

Synonyms
- Archaeobelus Cope, 1877

Extinct genus of synapsids

Clepsydrops is an extinct genus of primitive synapsids from the early Late Carboniferous that was related to Archaeothyris. The name means 'hour-glass appearance' (Greek klepsydra = "hourglass" + Greek ops = "eye, face, appearance").

Synapsida is the group (or clade) that includes mammals, but the term is mainly used to refer to its earliest members. Like many other early terrestrial amniotes, it probably had the diet of insects and smaller animals. It probably laid eggs on land rather than in the water, as most amniote tetrapods did.

A paleobiological inference model for the femur suggests a terrestrial lifestyle for Clepsydrops, as for its more recent relative Ophiacodon. This is consistent with its rather thin, compact cortex. Its jaws were slightly more advanced than those of other early amniote tetrapods like Paleothyris and Hylonomus.

== See also ==
- List of pelycosaurs
- Evolution of mammals
- Carboniferous tetrapods
- List of transitional fossils
