= List of Permian tetrapods =

Amphibians and reptiles of the geological period

Permian tetrapods were amphibians and reptiles that lived during the Permian Period.

During this time, amphibians remained common, including various Temnospondyli and Lepospondyli. Synapsids became the dominant type of animal, represented by the Pelycosaurs during the Early Permian and Therapsids during the Middle and Late Permian, and distinguished by the appearance and possession of mammal-like characteristics (hence the old term "mammal-like reptiles"). These were accompanied by Anapsids or Parareptiles, which included both lizard-like and large herbivorous forms, and primitive diapsids.

== Classification ==
The following list of families of Permian tetrapods is based mostly on Benton ed. 1993. The classification follows Benton 2004:

Superclass Tetrapoda

- Class Amphibia

- Order Temnospondyli

- Family Edopidae
- Family Cochleosauridae
- Family Trimerorhachidae
- Family Dvinosauridae
- Family Saurerpetontidae
- Family Brachyopidae
- Family Actinodontidae
- Family Intasuchidae
- Family Archegosauridae
- Family Rhinesuchidae
- Family Uranocentrodontidae
- Family Zatrachydidae
- Family Eryopidae
- Family Parioxyidae
- Family Peltobatrachidae
- Family Trematopidae
- Family Dissorophidae
- Family Micromelerpetontidae
- Family Branchiosauridae
- Family Amphibamidae

- Superorder Lepospondyli

- Order Aïstopoda

- Family Phlegethontiidae

- Order Nectridea

- Family Diplocaulidae
- Family Scincosauridae
- Family Urocordylidae

- Order Lysorophia

- Family Lysorophidae

- Order Microsauria

- Family Microbrachidae
- Family Brachyslechidae
- Family Tuditanidae
- Family Hapsidopareiontidae
- Family Pantylidae
- Family Gymnarthridae
- Family Ostodolepididae
- Family Rhynchonkidae
- Family Cocytinidae

- Superorder Reptiliomorpha

- Order Anthracosauria

- Family Eogyrinidae
- Family Archeriidae
- Family Chroniosuchidae
- Family Bystrowianidae

- Order Seymouriamorpha

- Family Seymouriidae
- Family Discosauriscidae
- Family Kotlassiidae

Orders/Suborders Uncertain

- Family Leptorophidae
- Family Enosuchidae
- Family Nycleroleridae
- Family Tokosauridae
- Family Lanthanosuchidae
- Family Tseajiidae

- Order Diadectomorpha

- Family Limnoscelididae
- Family Diadectidae

Series Amniota

- Class Sauropsida

- Subclass Anapsida

- Family Acleistorhinidae
- Family Eunotosauridae
- Family Mesosauridae
- Family Millerettidae
- Family Nyctiphruretidae
- Family Procolophonidae
- Family Pareiasauridae

- Basal Eureptilia

- Family Captorhinidae
- Family Protorothyrididae

- Subclass Diapsida

- Order Araeoscelidia

- Family Araeoscelididae

Orders unspecified

- Family Weigeltisauridae
- Family Claudiosauridae
- Family Heleosauridae

- Order Younginiformes

- Family Acerosodontosaurus
- Family Younginidae
- Family Tangasauridae
- Family Galesphyridae

- Infraclass Lepidosauromorpha

- Family Paliguanidae

- Infraclass Archosauromorpha

- Order Prolacertiformes

- Family Protorosauridae

- Division Archosauria

- Class Synapsida

- Order Pelycosauria

- Family Eothyrididae
- Family Caseidae
- Family Varanopidae
- Family Ophiacodontidae
- Family Edaphosauridae
- Family Sphenacodontidae

- Order Therapsida

- Tetraceratops

- Suborder Biarmosuchia

- Family Phthinosuchidae
- Family Biarmosuchidae
- Family Ictidorhinidae
- Family Burnetiidae
- Family Eotitanosuchidae

- Suborder Dinocephalia

- Family Estemmenosuchidae
- Family Anteosauridae
- Family Titanosuchidae
- Family Tapinocephalidae

- Suborder Gorgonopsia

- Family Gorgonopsidae

- Suborder Anomodontia/Dicynodontia

- Family Dromasauridae
- Family Otsheriidae
- Family Galeopidae
- Family Venyukoviidae
- Family Eodicynodontidae
- Family Endothiodontidae
- Family Cryptodontidae
- Family Aulacephalodontidae
- Family Dicynodontidae
- Family Pristerodontidae
- Family Emydopidae
- Family Robertiidae
- Family Kingoriidae
- Family Pristerognathidae

- Suborder Therocephalia

- Family Hofmeyeriidae
- Family Euchambersiidae
- Family Whaitsiidae
- Family Ictidosuchidae
- Family Scaloposauridae
- Family Lycideopsidae

- Suborder Cynodontia

- Family Dviniidae
- Family Procynosuchidae
- Family Galesauridae

== See also ==
- List of Carboniferous tetrapods – Amphibians and reptiles of the period
- List of Devonian tetrapods
