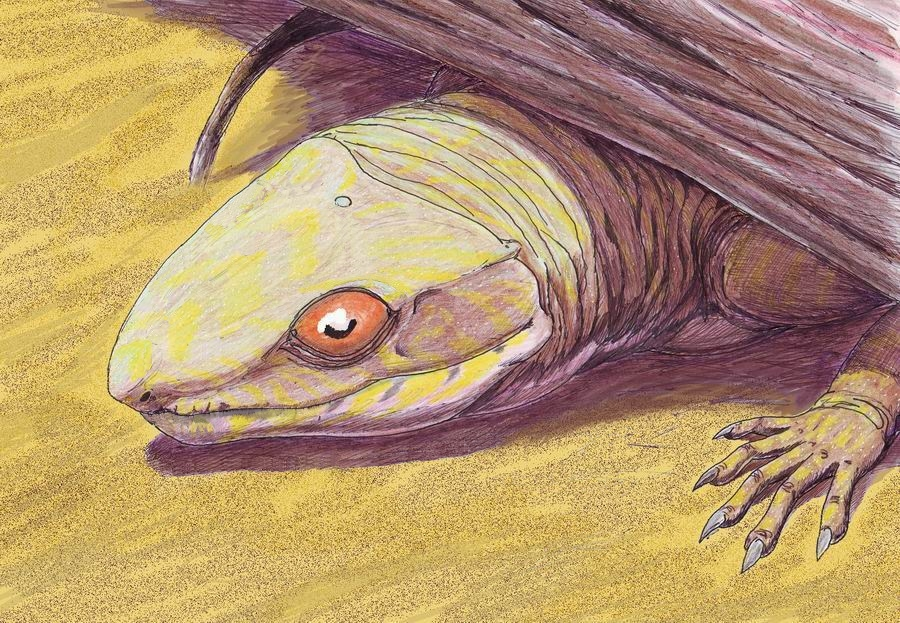
- Restoration of Oedaleops campi

Scientific classification
- Kingdom: Animalia
- Phylum: Chordata
- Clade: Synapsida
- Clade: †Caseasauria
- Family: †Eothyrididae
- Genus: †Oedaleops; Langston, 1965

Type species
- †Oedaleops campi Langston, 1965

= Oedaleops =

Oedaleops Temporal range: Early Permian, 299–280 Ma

Extinct genus of synapsids

Oedaleops is an extinct genus of caseasaur from the Early Permian of the Southwestern United States. Fossils have been found in the Cutler Formation in New Mexico, which dates back to the Wolfcampian stage of the Early Permian. All remains belong to the single known species Oedaleops campi. Oedaleops was closely related to Eothyris, and both are part of the family Eothyrididae. Like Eothyris, it was probably an insectivore.

== Discovery ==
Oedaleops was first described by paleontologist Wann Langston Jr. in 1965 on the basis of a mostly complete skull (specimen UCMP 35758, the holotype of Oedaleops) and a few isolated skull and postcranial fragments. The UCMP 35758 skull has been the sole specimen of Oedaleops used in most analyses of its evolutionary relationships. The more fragmentary specimens have been assigned to Oedaleops with caution because they are hard to distinguish from the bones of other Cutler Formation synapsids such as Aerosaurus. Additional specimens of Oedaleops were described in 2013, including many isolated dentaries (lower jaw bones), pectoral and limb bones, and disarticulated vertebrae representing at least three new individuals.

== Description ==
Oedaleops has a wide and low skull with a convex margin when viewed from the side. It has large orbits or eye sockets and numerous teeth, the most of any caseasaur. It differs from its closest relative, Eothyris, in having a frontal bone that forms a greater portion of the upper margin of the orbit. Another distinguishing feature of Oedaleops is the thinness of the postorbital bar, a strut of bone separating the back of the orbit from a hole in the back of the skull called the temporal fenestra. Oedaleops lacks the enlarged caniniform teeth and blunt snout of Eothyris.

Because no tail bones are known, the total body length of Oedaleops is uncertain. The length of the dorsal vertebral column (the length of vertebrae making up the back) can be estimated at 20 centimetres (7.9 in) from the lengths of individual dorsal vertebrae in Oedaleops and the number of dorsal vertebrae present in related synapsids. Adding the length of the skull gives a snout-vent length (the length of the body from the tip of the skull to hips) of 25 centimetres (9.8 in). Like other early synapsids, Oedaleops probably had sprawling limbs and a body set low to the ground. The front of the body may have been slightly elevated above the level of the hips.

== Relationships ==
Since its naming in 1965, Oedaleops has been interpreted as a close relative of Eothyris from the Early Permian of Texas. Langston placed both in the family Eothyrididae. Since 1980, most phylogenetic analyses place eothyridids in a clade or evolutionary grouping called Caseasauria, which also includes a family of mostly herbivorous Early Permian synapsids called Caseidae. The majority of analyses place Caseasauria as the basal-most clade within Synapsida. With caseids and eothyridids are equally closely related to the last common ancestor of synapsids, the body plan of Oedaleops and other eothyridids (characterized by large heads and relatively narrow bodies) more closely approximates what is predicted for the synapsid common ancestor than does the body plan of caseids (characterized by extremely small heads and barrel-shaped bodies). Therefore, Oedaleops is one of the most important taxa in phylogenetic analyses and the features of its skeleton have an important bearing on the relationships of other synapsids. Below is a cladogram from the phylogenetic analysis of Sumida et al. (2013) that shows many of the same relationships as those found in previous analyses, except for having Eothyris being more closely related to caseids than to Oedaleops (making Eothyrididae paraphyletic):

- Synapsida
  - Caseasauria
    - Oedaleops
    - - Eothyris
      - Cotylorhynchus
  - Eupelycosauria
    - Ophiacodontidae
      - Archaeothyris
      - Ophiacodon
    - Varanopidae
      - Archaeovenator
      - - - Mesenosaurus
          - Mycterosaurus
        - - Elliotsmithia
          - - Aerosaurus
            - - Varanops
              - - Varanodon
                - Watongia
