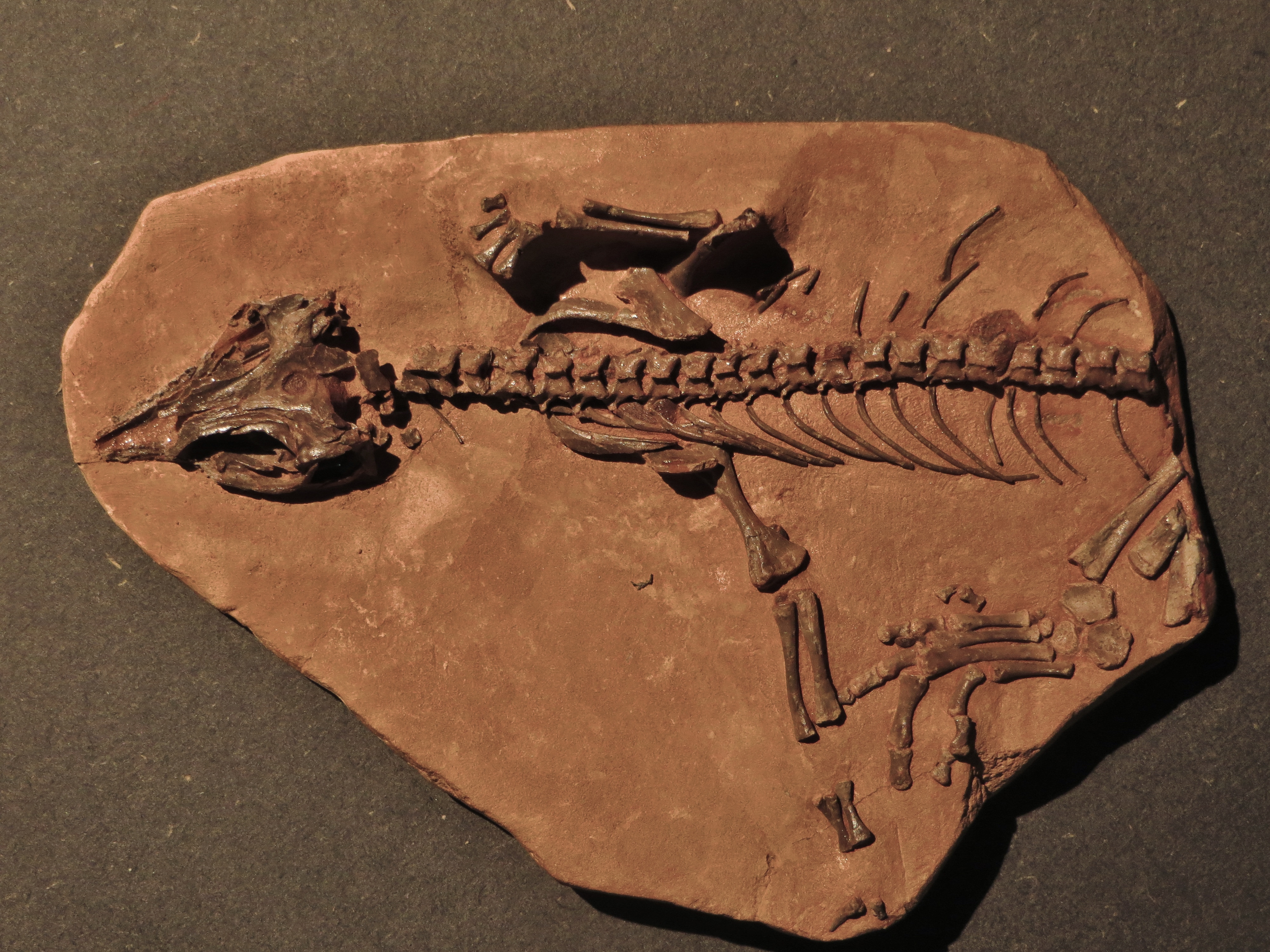
- Mesenosaurus romeri

Scientific classification
- Kingdom: Animalia
- Phylum: Chordata
- Clade: Synapsida
- Family: †Varanopidae
- Subfamily: †Mycterosaurinae
- Genus: †Mesenosaurus; Efremov, 1938

Type species
- †Mesenosaurus romeri Efremov, 1938

Species
- M. romeri Efremov, 1938; M. efremovi Maho, Gee et Reisz, 2019

= Mesenosaurus =

Mesenosaurus Temporal range: Permian, 289–265 Ma

Extinct genus of synapsids

Mesenosaurus is an extinct genus of synapsid belonging to the family Varanopidae. This genus includes two species: the type species Mesenosaurus romeri from the middle Permian (upper Kazanian) Mezen River Basin of northern Russia, and Mesenosaurus efremovi from the early Permian (Artinskian) Richards Spur locality (Oklahoma, United States). M. romeri’s stratigraphic range is the middle to late Guadalupian while M. efremovi’s stratigraphic range is the Cisuralian.

== Etymology ==
Famous Russian paleontologist, Ivan Efremov, established Mesenosaurus as a genus. The genus name means “lizard from Mezen” while the specific epithet is given in honor of Alfred Romer.

Mesenosaurus efremovi was named in honor of Ivan Efremov, who erected the genus.

== Description ==
Mesenosaurus are small sized varanopid synapsids. They are characterized by mainly cranial features. Many of the postcranial features of this genus have not been analyzed fully due to a lack of fossil evidence.

=== Skull ===
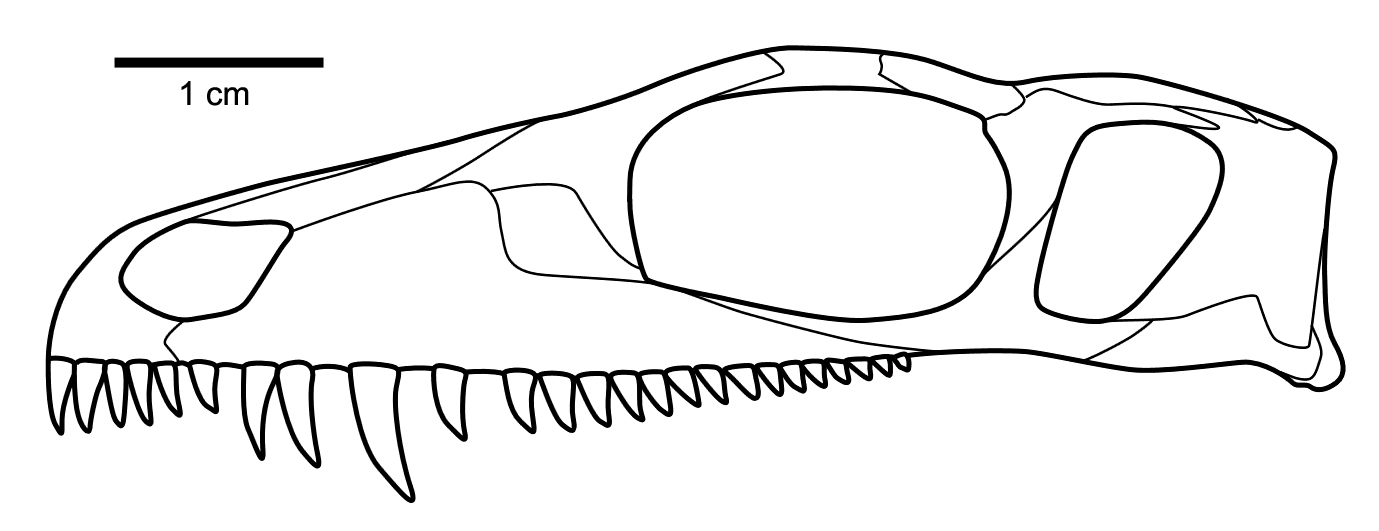
Mesenosaurus romeri skull illustration

The cranial features that characterize Mesenosaurus are:

1. Slender premaxilla forms a narrow, rectangular snout (from dorsal and ventral views)
2. Dorsal process of premaxilla is long and forms anterior half of dorsal margin of external naris
3. Expanded narial shelf that extends almost to the snout tip
4. Palatal process of premaxilla is long with long median suture
5. Well-developed depression on the lateral surface of the nasal that extends posteriorly from the narial border to nearly the anterior end of the prefrontal
6. Slight lateral swelling of the maxilla at the level of the caniniform tooth
7. Short posterior process of the maxilla fails to reach the level of the postorbital bar
8. First premaxillary tooth smaller than the second and third teeth. (There is a maximum of five teeth on the premaxilla. The first tooth is smaller than the second and third, but larger than the last two. These five teeth are closely spaced, strongly recurved, sharply pointed, and have a sharp, cutting edge along the distal half of the posterior edge.)
9. Single, median vomerine tooth row
10. Postorbital cheek region of skull unusually broad and low, with nearly vertical posterior margin
11. Posterior edge of transverse flange of the pterygoid is angled slightly anterolaterally from basal articulation.
12. Stapes slender, short, and rod-like, with modestly developed footplate and distally expanded quadrate process. (The stapes of Mesenosaurus more closely resembles those in early therapsids of the Permian.)
13. A very prominent, nodular ornamentation is present on the orbital margins of the prefrontal, postorbital, and jugal. (This characteristic is strikingly pronounced in well-preserved skulls of Mesenosaurus, so much so that Efremov originally considered it to be an autapomorphy of Mesenosaurus. However, careful examination and analysis have shown that this feature is present in other varanopids.)

== Discovery ==
=== Mesenosaurus romeri ===
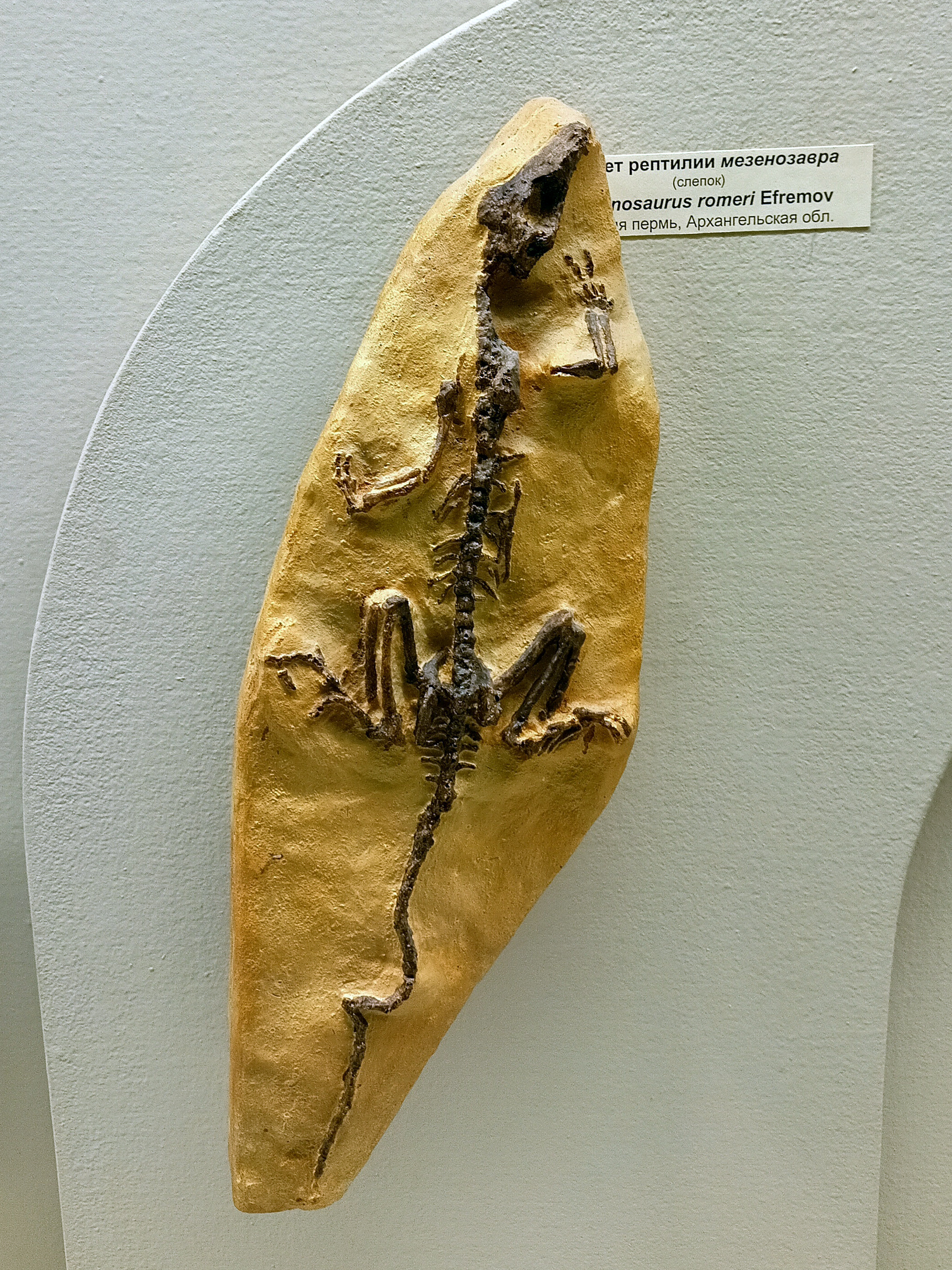
Mesenosaurus romeri skeleton

The Mezen River basin is located in northern Russia and has extensive exposures of Middle Permian sediments along the edges of affluent rivers of the Mezen River. These sediments have produced many skeletal remains of diverse amniotes, but most importantly, a partial skull of “a small synapsid of varanopseid affinities”, Mesenosaurus romeri. M. romeri was discovered in 1938 by Ivan Efremov and became the first species of Mesenosaurus, due to its lack of cranial similarities to others. It was also the first synapsid described from the Russian area to be considered a “good pelycosaur”, as it possessed upper jaw teeth that were consistent with other known pelycosaurs (slender, recurved, enlarged incisors, single caniniform tooth). Romer and Price hypothesized that M. romeri belonged to Varanopseidae. This hypothesis was confirmed in 2001 based on the following synapomorphies:

1. Dorsoventral expanded temporal fenestra occupies most of the height of temporal region, resulting in narrow subtemporal bar
2. Marginal dentition is composed of strongly recurved, laterally compressed, sharply pointed teeth front and back cutting edges restricted to the distal half of the tooth
3. Well-developed premaxillary subnarial shelf whose external surface is broadly rounded in transverse section
4. Anterior median process of parietal extends into the supraorbital region of skull table
5. Small postfrontal medially borders narrow, posterior process of the frontal
6. Tabular shrinks in size that become small, narrow elements that contacts medial margin of posterolateral wing of parietal
7. Absence of medial, occipital flange of posterior margin of squamosal that covers posterior margin of quadrate
8. Parasphenoid plate is broad and basisphenoidal tubera are wing like and extend far laterally and posteriorly from the base of cultriform process
9. Prominent, nodular ornamentation is present on orbital margins of prefrontal, postorbital, and jugal

=== Mesenosaurus efremovi ===
The second species of this genus is Mesenosaurus efremovi. Its nearly complete skull and mandible was discovered at Richards Spur locality within a series of infilled karst fissures in the Ordovician Arbuckle limestone in Oklahoma, which is one of the most plentiful sites for early Permian tetrapod fossils.

In terms of classifying M. efremovi, it shares distinct cranial features with mycterosaurines (stem based group that includes Mycterosaurus longiceps and all varanopseids related more closely to it than to Varanodon agilis), such as the “exclusion of the lacrimal from the external naris and an anteroposteriorly broad dorsal lamina of the maxilla that underlies the nasal and contacts the prefrontal”. However, M. efremovi shares more features with M. romeri from Russia. Some of these shared features include relative size and shape of the temporal fenestra, lateral swelling of the maxilla in the caniniform region and five premaxillary tooth positions (not reported in other mycterosaurines).

Though M. efremovi and M. romeri share many distinct features, there are four main morphological differences between these specimens that deem a taxonomic distinction at the species level (differences insufficient for distinction above species level):

1. The presence of short dorsal premaxillary processes (that do not extend to either the posterior narial margin or the posterior separation of the premaxillae by the nasals)
2. More posteriorly extensive maxilla
3. Fewer tooth positions on the maxilla
4. Contact between the postorbital and supratemporal bones

M. efremovi is also larger than the largest known specimen of M. romeri.

== Phylogeny ==
Below is a cladogram modified from the analysis of Benson, after the exclusion of Basicranodon:

- - Tseajaia campi
  - Limnoscelis paludis
  - Amniota
    - - Captorhinus spp.
      - Protorothyris archeri
    - Synapsida
      - - Caseasauria
        - - Ianthodon schultzei
          - - Edaphosauridae
            - Sphenacodontia
      - - Ophiacodontidae
          - Archaeothyris florensis
          - - Varanosaurus acutirostris
            - - Ophiacodon spp.
              - Stereophallodon ciscoensis
        - Varanopidae
          - Archaeovenator hamiltonensis
          - - Pyozia mesenensis
            - - Mycterosaurinae
                - Mycterosaurus longiceps
                - - ?Elliotsmithia longiceps (BP/1/5678)
                  - Heleosaurus scholtzi
                  - Mesenosaurus romeri
              - Varanopinae
                - - Varanops brevirostris
                  - - Watongia meieri
                    - Varanodon agilis
                - - Ruthiromia elcobriensis
                  - - Aerosaurus wellesi
                    - Aerosaurus greenleorum

== Paleoenvironment ==
There is a 20 Myr gap between these two species, which exceeds the temporal range of most extinct tetrapods. Though this gap is questionable, the radioisotopic dating of speleothems, recovered for Richards Spur, used to identify this 20 Myr gap is a reliable technique that has been used to identify other large gaps/long temporal ranges. This gap is significant, as it indicates evolutionary stasis (persisting throughout different environments across Pangea as well as faunal turnovers throughout the Permian-specifically Olson’s gap). This evolutionary stasis may be attributed to a conserved niche occupation throughout their temporal and geographical ranges. Further research on postcranial features is required in order to determine if this hypothesis is correct, as we would need to observe a similar degree of stasis throughout the entire skeleton.

== Paleobiology ==
Mesenosaurus was a small mobile creature, capable of climbing rocks/trees. Their small size allowed them to occupy and thrive in niches as small faunivores while therapsids dominated most terrestrial environments. It was not until the late Permian when small diapsids appeared and provided competition, leading to a decline in Mesenosaurus. Mesenosaurus represents a guild of highly agile subordinate predators in their communities due to their large, slender, curved teeth, which could cause severe wounds when piercing its prey. The success of Mesenosaurus as a mid-sized, hypercarnivorous predator is believed to have been facilitated by its heterodont dentition. Mesenosaurus was also characterised by extremely rapid rates of tooth development and greatly reduced tooth longevity compared to almost every other land-dwelling amniote.

They possessed unbent and flattened unguals, suggesting they were diggers. It is uncertain whether their digging unguals were adapted for burrowing or solely digging for food. Many varanopids were arboreal, however the well-developed olecranon(bony prominence of the elbow) of Mesenosaurus indicates the presence of triceps and anconeus muscle, both of which would provide powerful forearm extension. This forearm extension strength combined with its somewhat small/medium body size supports the idea of a burrowing lifestyle. It is also proposed that facultative bipedalism occurred in Mesenosaurus. This is based on the presence of a rearward shift of center of body mass (slender trunks, elongated hindlimbs, and short forelimbs) that is necessary for facultative bipedalism.

== See also ==
- List of pelycosaurs
- List of varanopids
