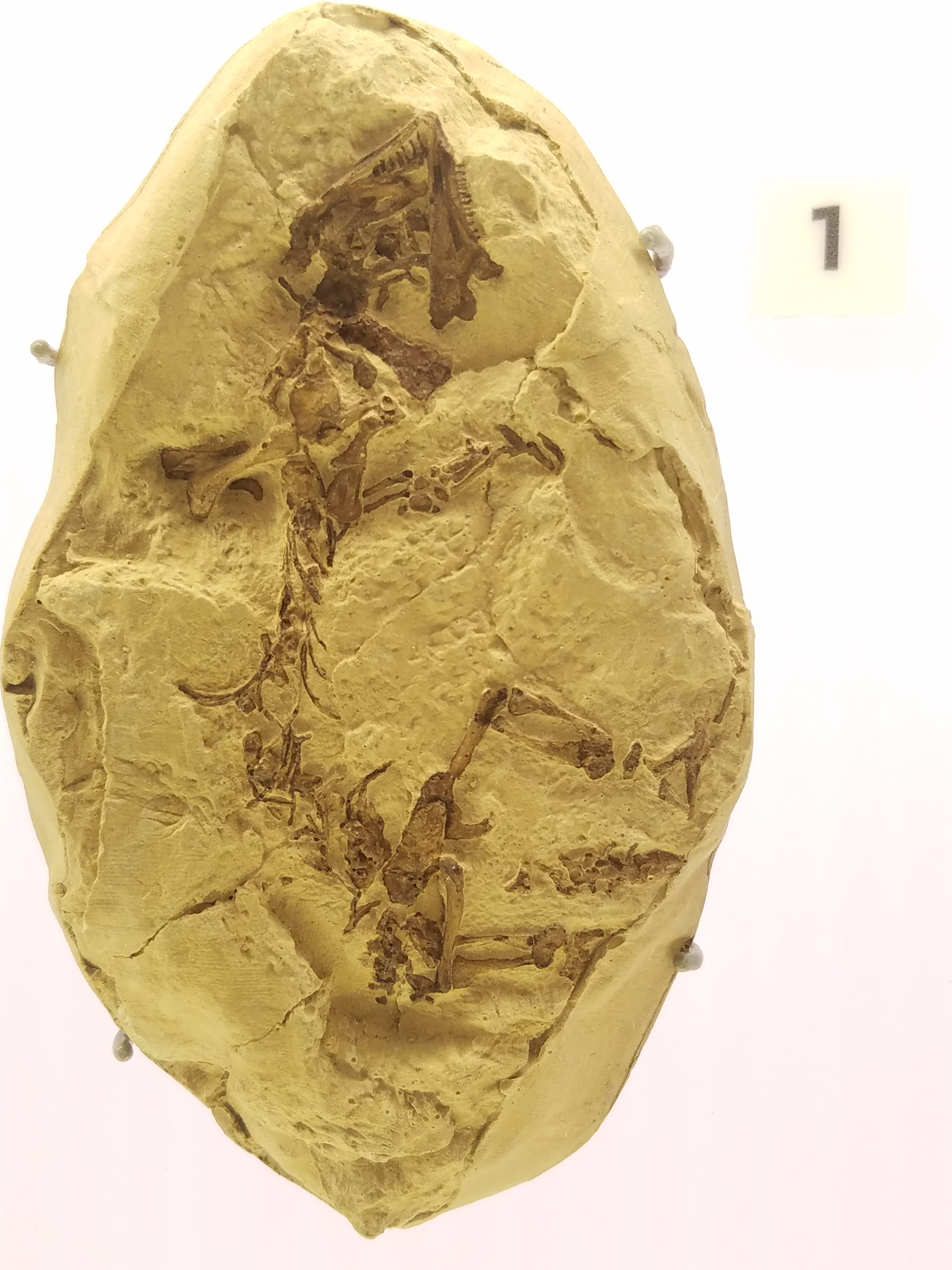
- Paleothyris acadiana fossil

Scientific classification
- Kingdom: Animalia
- Phylum: Chordata
- Genus: †Paleothyris; Carroll, 1969
- Species: †P. acadiana

Binomial name
- †Paleothyris acadiana Carroll, 1969

= Paleothyris =

Paleothyris Temporal range: Moscovian

Extinct genus of reptiles

Paleothyris is an extinct genus of small reptiliomorph which lived in the Moscovian age of the Late Carboniferous in Nova Scotia.

== Description ==
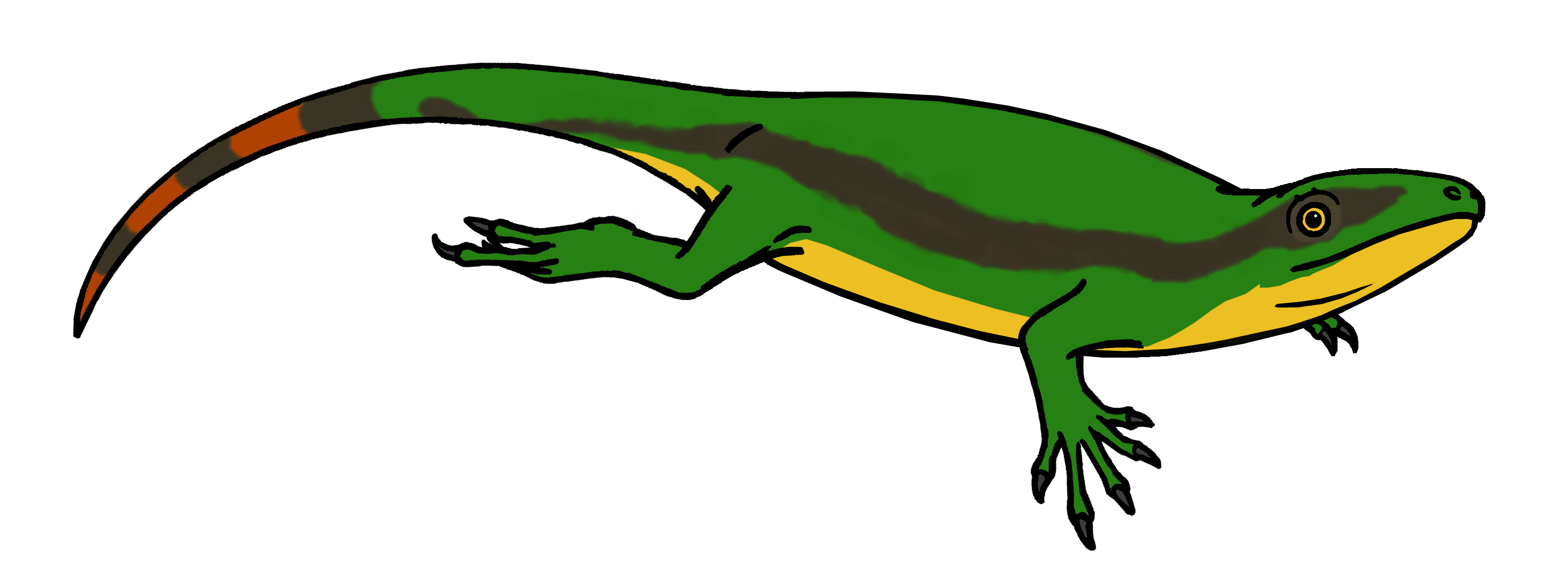
Life restoration

Skull reconstruction

Paleothyris had sharp teeth and large eyes, meaning that it was likely a nocturnal hunter. It was about a foot long. It probably fed on insects and other smaller animals found on the floor of its forest home. Paleothyris was an early sauropsid, yet it still had some features that were more primitive, more labyrinthodont-like than reptile-like, especially its skull, which lacked fenestrae, holes found in the skulls of most modern reptiles and mammals.

== See also ==
- Westlothiana
- Casineria
- Hylonomus
- Petrolacosaurus
- Archaeothyris
- Carboniferous tetrapods
