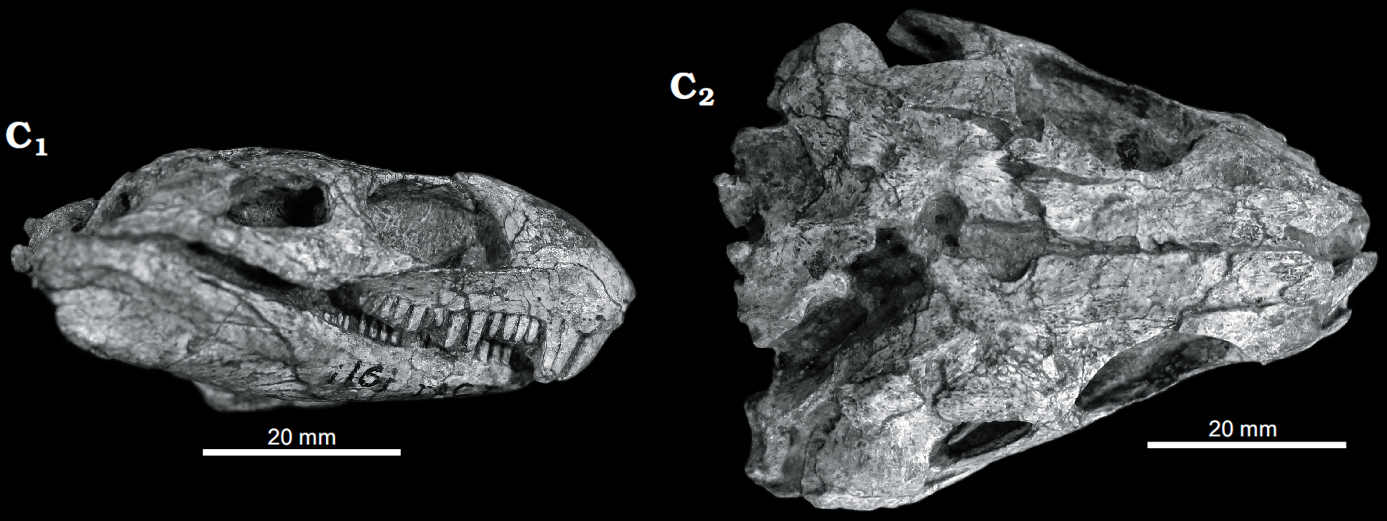
- Holotype skull

Scientific classification
- Kingdom: Animalia
- Phylum: Chordata
- Clade: Synapsida
- Clade: †Caseasauria
- Family: †Eothyrididae
- Genus: †Eothyris; Romer, 1937

Type species
- Eothyris parkeyi Romer, 1937

= Eothyris =

Eothyris Temporal range: Early Permian, 290.1–279.5 Ma

Extinct genus of synapsids

Eothyris is a genus of extinct synapsid in the family Eothyrididae from the early Permian. It was a carnivorous insectivorous animal, closely related to Oedaleops. Only the skull of Eothyris, first described in 1937, is known. It had a 6-centimetre-long (2.4-inch) skull, and its total estimated length was 30 centimetres (12 inches). Eothyris is one of the most primitive synapsids known and is probably very similar to the common ancestor of all synapsids in many respects. The only known specimen of Eothyris was collected from the Artinskian-lower.

== Discovery and naming ==
Eothyris parkeyi was one of many new species of "pelycosaurs" discovered by Alfred Sherwood Romer as part of a series of paleontological expeditions for the Museum of Comparative Zoology (MCZ). The genoholotype (type specimen of a genus) and only known specimen of Eothyris is a complete skull and associated jaws, with the collection number MCZ 1161. This skull was collected about one mile west of the former Woodrum ranch-house, in Early Permian sediments of the Artinskian-lower Kungurian Belle Plains Formation, Wichita Group, south of Dundee, Texas, USA. in rocks which are about 275 million years old. The generic name is Greek for "dawn opening", likely in reference for its status as one of the most primitive known synapsids. The specific name refers to J.R. Parkey, of Mankins, Texas, a local landowner who assisted the MCZ field crew in collecting fossils on his property. Eothyris was briefly described by Romer in 1937, and given a more comprehensive description by Romer and Llewellyn Ivor Price in 1940.

== Description ==
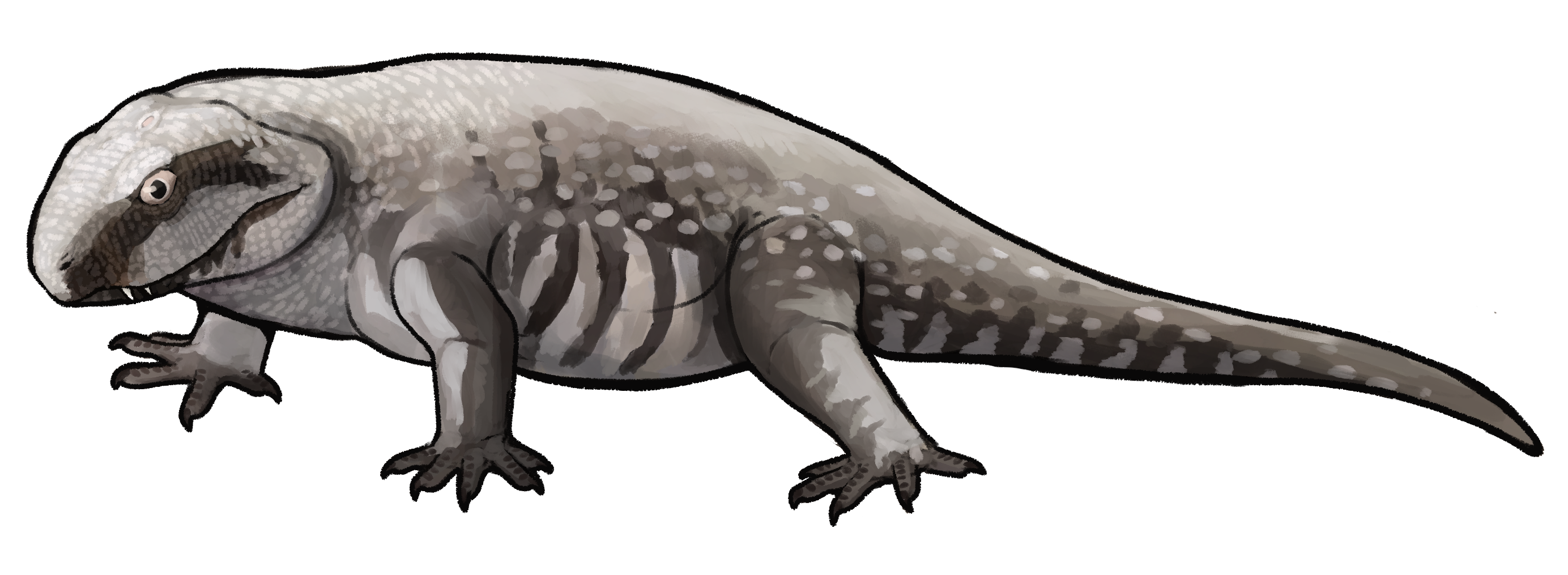
Restoration

Eothyris is known only from its complete skull, however, the postcranial skeleton is unknown. Its skull is short and broad with a total skull length of 5.7 cm (2.25 in), Benson et al. estimated the body to be 30 cm (12 in) long. The major distinguishing features of the skull are that it possessed a pair of long, large, fang-like teeth on each side of the upper jaw. The main differences between Eothyris and Oedaleops are related to the degree of specialization in the dentition of the geologically younger Eothyris.

Skull

The superficial dermal elements are preserved, and the occiput is visible. The skull is clearly low, very broad, and short. With normal length of postorbital and orbital regions. The face is much shorter than any other pelycosaur except edaphosaurs. Lacrimal expanded laterally upper the canines. Maxilla contributes to the edge of the orbit as there is no lacrimal jugal contact in the orbit. The squamosal and postorbital are extensively in contact because the temporal opening is small and of oval shape. Also, because the cheek slants outward to very higher degree than is usual in pelycosaurs, the temporal opening is exposed in dorsal view. The premaxillae and nasals are short and the frontals are of moderate length. The supratemporal in Eothyris parkeyi is much more extremely developed than in any other pelycosaur. In Eothyris parkeyi, the postorbital bone is probably the largest for any synapsid, with large lateral and dorsal portions to the skull roof. The slope from skull table to quadrate is gentle, due to shortness of skull. The quadratojugal is very long and jaw articulation is in line with the tooth row. Typical pterygoid flanges and slender are present back in the skull, below the anterior part of the temporal opening. The quadrate is on the right side and is exposed dorsally. The interparietal and tabulars occupy the dorsal rim of the occipital surface.

Teeth

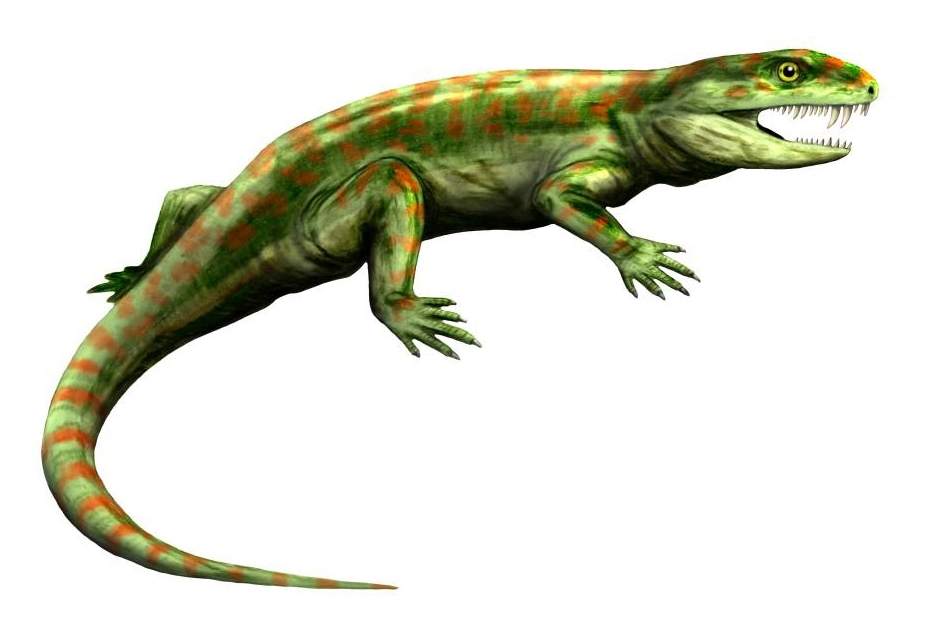
Another restoration

As Eothyris parkeyi has a short face, the lower jaw does not have a slender build. Dentary, angular, and surangular are visible on the outer surface, and also, the lower edge of the splenial is visible in the ventral view. The medial surface of the jaw is not visible. The teeth are pointed with slightly recurved. Eothyris parkeyi had about 14 or 15 teeth, depending on the disposition of the precanine. The premaxilla carried three not enlarged teeth. In Eothyris parkeyi due to shortness of the face, there are no precanine maxillary teeth. this feature is more specialized than any known sphenacodont. Very enlarged pair of canines, giving the snout distinctly a swollen appearance immediately posterior to the external naris. The most significant feature of Eothyris parkeyi is probably the morphology of the maxilla, because of its unique dental pattern. The maxilla in Eothyris parkeyi is a thin, elongate element with an abrupt dorsal expansion in the area of the primary canine pair.

== Classification ==
Eothyris is classified in the monophyletic family Eothyrididae. It is one of two genera in the family, the other being Oedaleops. The family is grouped in Caseasauria, and only cranial remains are known from it. The family is greatly supported, with nine dental and cranial features. Below is the cladogram of the analysis of Reisz et al. (2009).

- - Diadectomorpha
  - - Reptilia
    - Synapsida
      - Caseasauria
        - Caseidae
          - Casea broili
          - - Casea rutena
            - Cotylorhynchus
        - Eothyrididae
          - Eothyris
          - Oedaleops
      - Eupelycosauria
        - - Archaeothyris
          - Ophiacodon
        - - - - Mesenosaurus
              - Mycterosaurus
            - Varanops
          - Archaeovenator

== Paleobiology ==
The short face and dental structures represent an extreme type of development of predaceous habits far off from those in a pelycosaur ancestor and entirely distinct from the milder dental differentiations of ophiacodontids. The skull measure of Eothyris parkeyi is extremely small for a pelycosaur. Eothyris parkeyi is represented by a complete skull, but the postcranial skeleton is unknown. Therefore, there is the little foundation to diagnose the extended family. Also, the skull of Eothyris parkeyi is described according to that form. Whether many of the striking primitive features were repeated in other genera is unknown.

The order of the portion of bones in the skull roof of Oedaleops and Eothyris parkeyi conforms to a basic pattern in primitive reptiles and is shared with various groups such as millerosaurs and captorhinomorphs, and ophiacodonts. The major distinguishing features of the skull are that it possessed a pair of long, large, fang-like teeth on each side of the upper jaw. The use for these teeth is not known, but Eothyris parkeyi might have used them to eat small prey. All teeth in its mouth were sharp, with all but the enlarged four fangs being small and short. The skull is short and broad, two features which suggest that Eothyris parkeyi had a snapping, rapid bite.

Dental specializations are related to predaceous habits. The Eothyrids tended to be dominant types and it is interesting that except for little Eothyris parkeyi, which may be considered as a small late survivor. Its teeth suggest that it was a carnivore, but because Eothyris parkeyi is known only from a skull, it is difficult to say much else about its way of life.
