= Protoclepsydrops =

Protoclepsydrops Temporal range: Late Carboniferous, 318–315 Ma

Scientific classification
- Kingdom: Animalia
- Phylum: Chordata
- Clade: Synapsida
- Clade: incertae sedis
- Genus: †Protoclepsydrops; Carroll, 1964

Type species
- †Protoclepsydrops haplous Carroll, 1964

Extinct genus of tetrapods

Protoclepsydrops is an extinct genus of early synapsids, found in Joggins, Nova Scotia. The name means 'first Clepsydrops', and refers to it being the predecessor of the other early synapsid Clepsydrops.

== Description ==
Like Archaeothyris, Protoclepsydrops resembled a modern lizard in superficial appearance. However, Protoclepsydrops had primitive vertebrae with tiny neural processes typical of their amniote ancestors. Protoclepsydrops is known from a few vertebrae and some humeri.

== Classification ==
Its skeletal remains indicate that it may have been more closely related to synapsids than to sauropsids, making it a possible stem-mammal. If so, it is the oldest synapsid known, though its status is unconfirmed because its remains are too fragmentary. Protoclepsydrops lived slightly earlier than Archaeothyris. It is possibly synonymous with Asaphestera, another early synapsid discovered from the same locality.

== See also ==
- List of pelycosaurs
- Evolution of mammals
- List of transitional fossils
- Carboniferous tetrapods
- Clepsydrops
