= List of Devonian tetrapods =

Fishapods and amphibians of the geological period

Devonian tetrapods include fishapods and amphibians that lived during the Devonian Period.

== Elpistostegalia ==
Genus	Status	Age	Location	Description	Images
Elpistostege	Valid	Frasnian	Canada		
Howittichthys	Valid	Frasnian	Australia		
Livoniana	Valid	Frasnian	Latvia and Estonia		
Panderichthys	Valid	Frasnian	Latvia	0.9–1.3 m long	
Parapanderichthys	Valid	Frasnian	Russia		
Tiktaalik	Valid	Frasnian	Canada	2.75 m long	

== Ichthyostegalia ==
Genus	Status	Age	Location	Description	Images
Acanthostega	Valid	Famennian	Greenland	0.6 m long	
Densignathus	Valid	Famennian	United States		
Elginerpeton	Valid	Frasnian	United Kingdom	1.5 m long	
Hynerpeton	Valid	Famennian	United States	1.2 m long	
Ichthyostega	Valid	Famennian	Greenland	1.5 m long	
Jakubsonia	Valid	Famennian	Russia		
Metaxygnathus	Valid	Famennian	Australia		
Obruchevichthys	Valid	Frasnian	Latvia		
Sinostega	Valid	Famennian	China		
Tulerpeton	Valid	Famennian	Russia		
Ventastega	Valid	Famennian	Latvia	1 m long	
Ymeria	Valid	Famennian	Greenland		
Tutusius umlambo	Valid	Famennian	South Africa	1.2 m long	
Umzantsia amazana	Valid	Famennian	South Africa	0.8 m long	

== See also ==
- Carboniferous tetrapods – Amphibians and reptiles of the period
- Permian tetrapods – Amphibians and reptiles of the geological period
