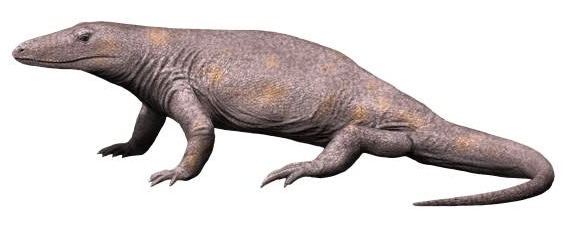
- A reconstruction of Varanosaurus acutirostris
- Photograph of skeleton from 1919

Scientific classification
- Kingdom: Animalia
- Phylum: Chordata
- Clade: Synapsida
- Family: †Ophiacodontidae
- Genus: †Varanosaurus; Broili, 1904

Type species
- †Varanosaurus acutirostris Broili, 1904

Species
- †V. acutirostris Broili 1904 (type); †V. wichitaensis Romer 1937

= Varanosaurus =

Varanosaurus Temporal range: Early Permian, 290–273 Ma

Extinct genus of synapsids

Varanosaurus ('monitor lizard') is an extinct genus of early ophiacodontid synapsid that lived during the Artinskian and Kungurian ages of the Permian.

== Description ==
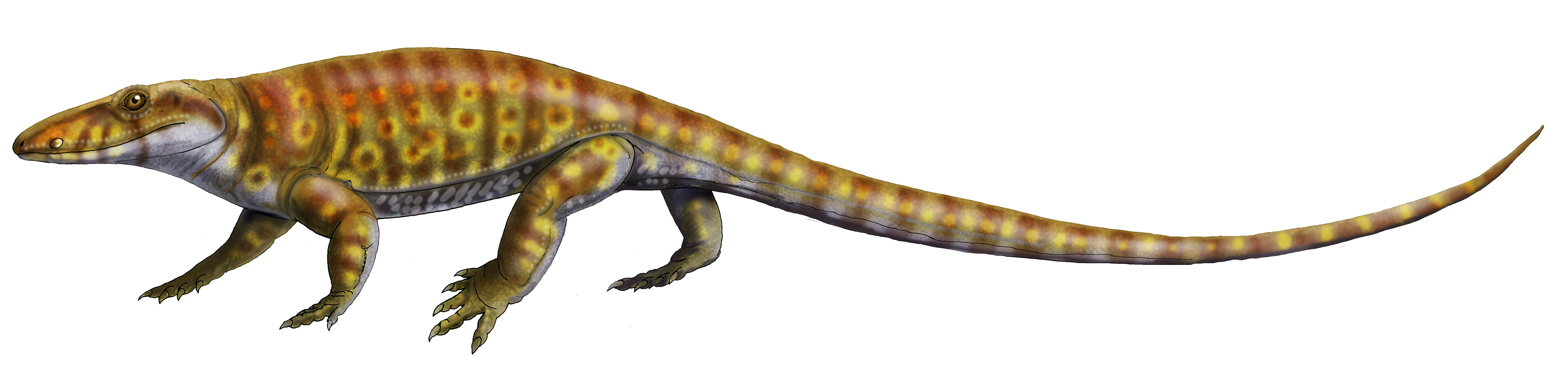
Life restoration

As its name implies, Varanosaurus may have looked superficially similar to present-day monitor lizards, though not related at all.

Varanosaurus had a flattened, elongated skull and a pointed snout with a row of sharp teeth, including two pairs of conspicuous pseudocanines, implying that it was an active predator.

Varanosaurus probably lived in swamps, competing with the larger Ophiacodon for food.

== Classification ==
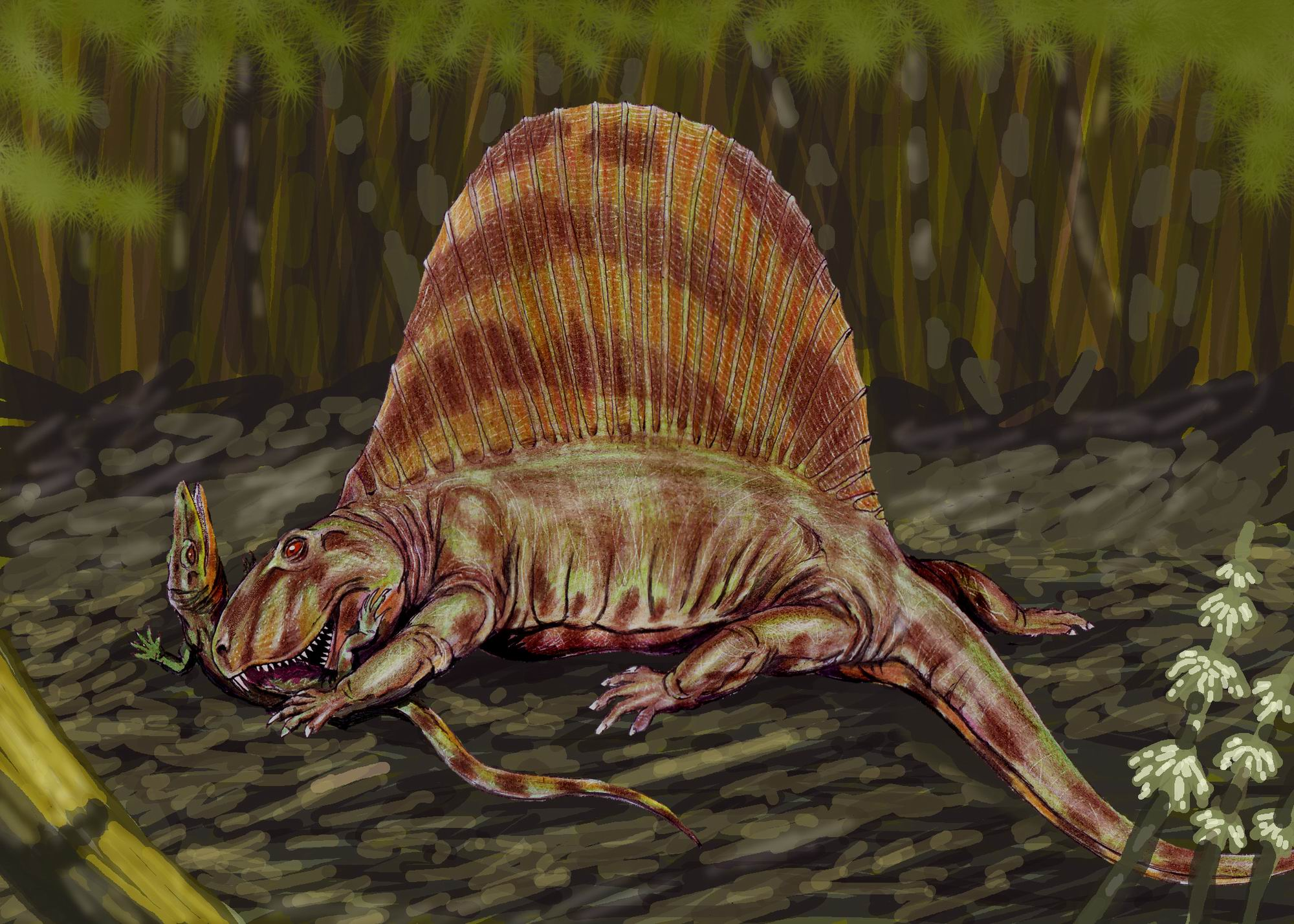
Varanosaurus acutirostris being devoured by Dimetrodon limbatus

Below is a cladogram modified from the analysis of Benson (2012):

- - Tseajaia campi
  - Limnoscelis paludis
  - Amniota
    - - Captorhinus spp.
      - Protorothyris archeri
    - Synapsida
      - - Caseasauria
        - - Ianthodon schultzei
          - - Edaphosauridae
            - Sphenacodontia
      - - Varanopidae
        - Ophiacodontidae
          - Archaeothyris florensis
          - - Varanosaurus acutirostris
            - - Ophiacodon spp.
              - Stereophallodon ciscoensis

== See also ==
- List of pelycosaurs
