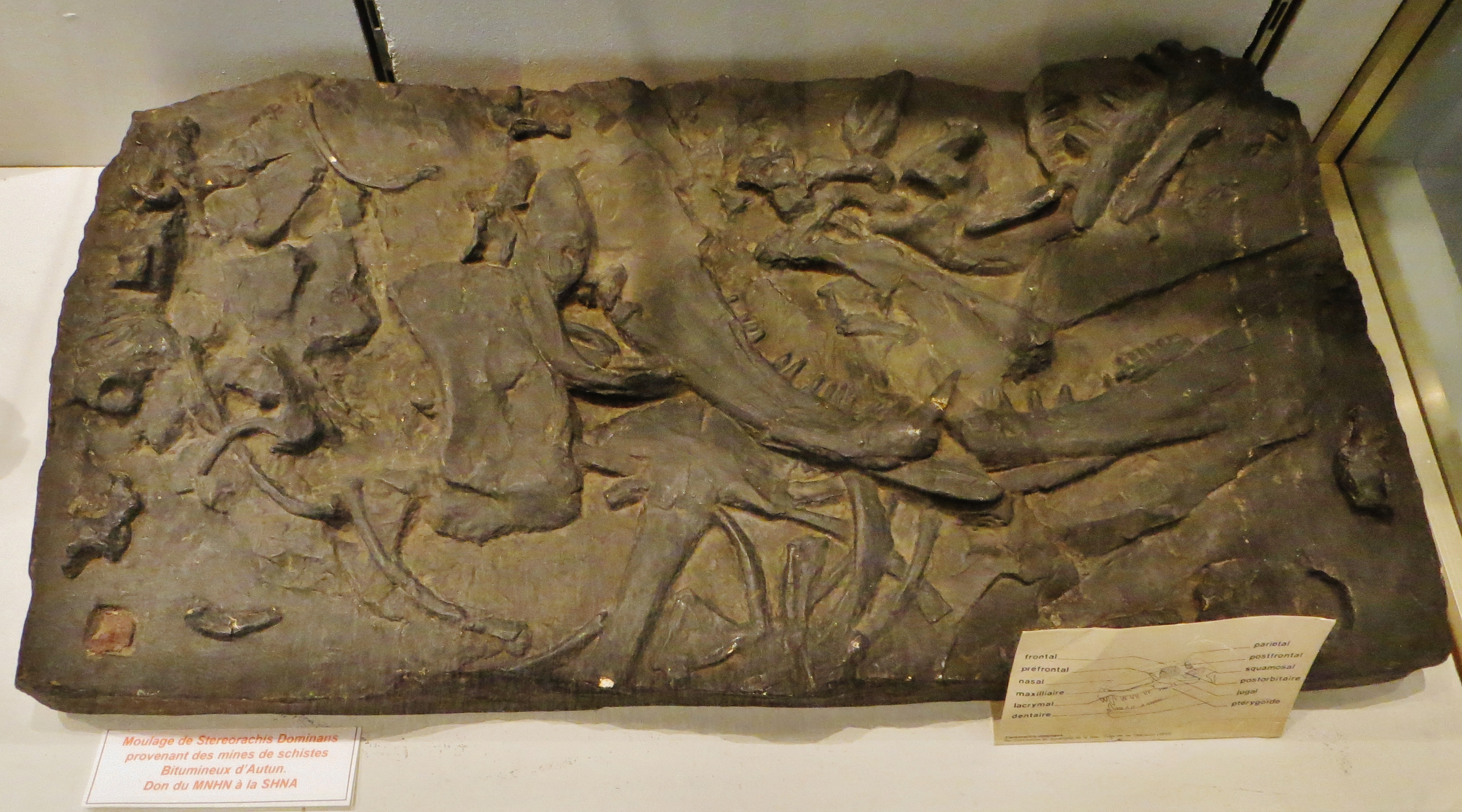
- Fossils in Museum of Natural History, Autun

Scientific classification
- Kingdom: Animalia
- Phylum: Chordata
- Clade: Synapsida
- Family: †Ophiacodontidae
- Genus: †Stereorachis; Gaudry, 1880

Type species
- †Stereorachis dominans Gaudry, 1880

Other species
- †S.? blanziacensis Langiaux et al., 1974

Synonyms
- Stereorhachis (Gaudry, 1880) (lapsus calami)

= Stereorachis =

Stereorachis Temporal range: Late Carboniferous

Extinct genus of synapsids

Stereorachis is an extinct genus of non-mammalian synapsids from the Late Carboniferous of France.

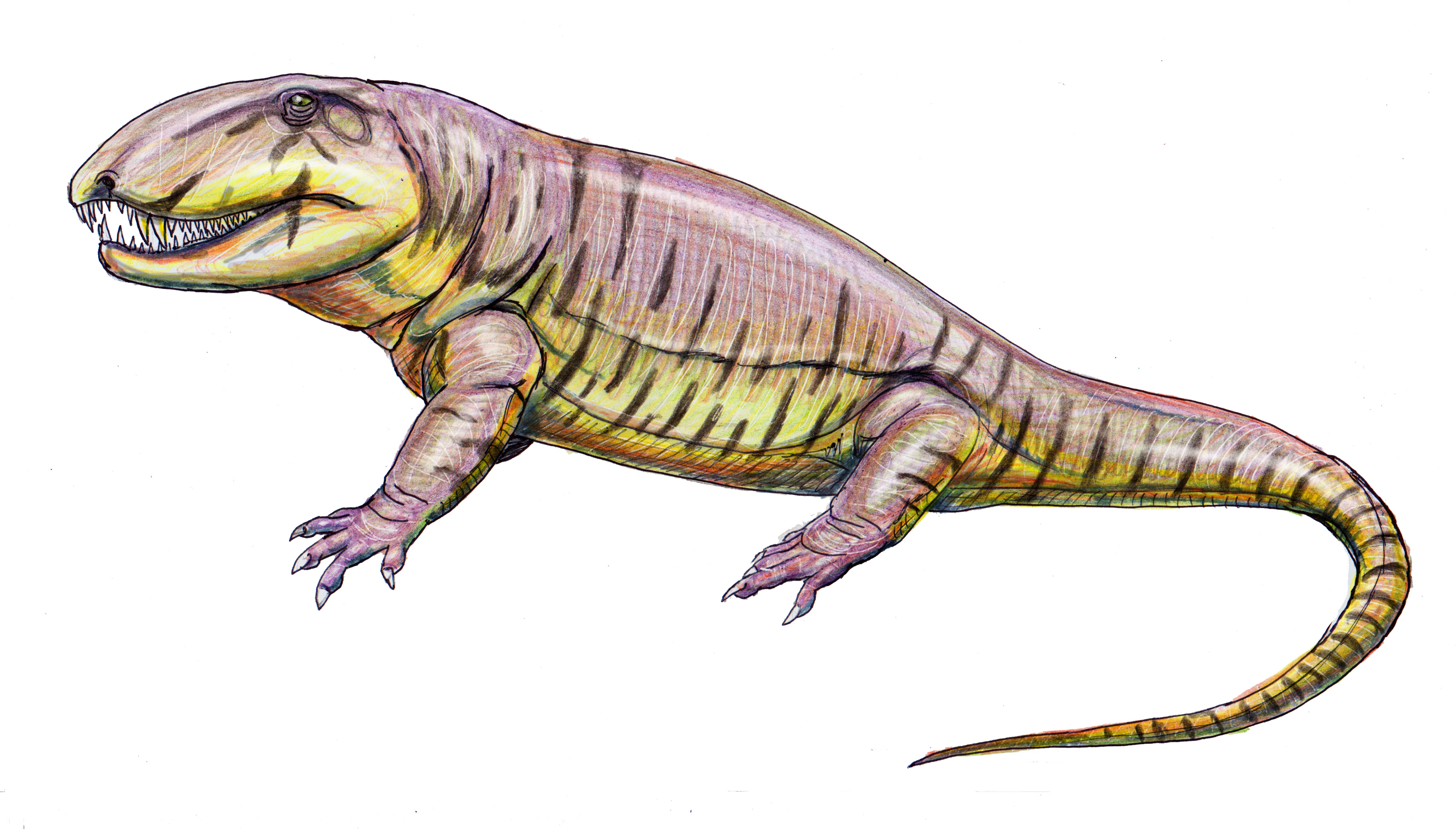
Restoration

== See also ==
- List of pelycosaurs
