= Nitosaurus =

Scientific classification
- Kingdom: Animalia
- Phylum: Chordata
- Clade: Synapsida
- Family: †Nitosauridae
- Genus: †Nitosaurus; Romer, 1937

Extinct genus of tetrapods

Nitosaurus is an extinct genus of non-mammalian synapsids.

== See also ==
- List of pelycosaurs
- List of therapsids
