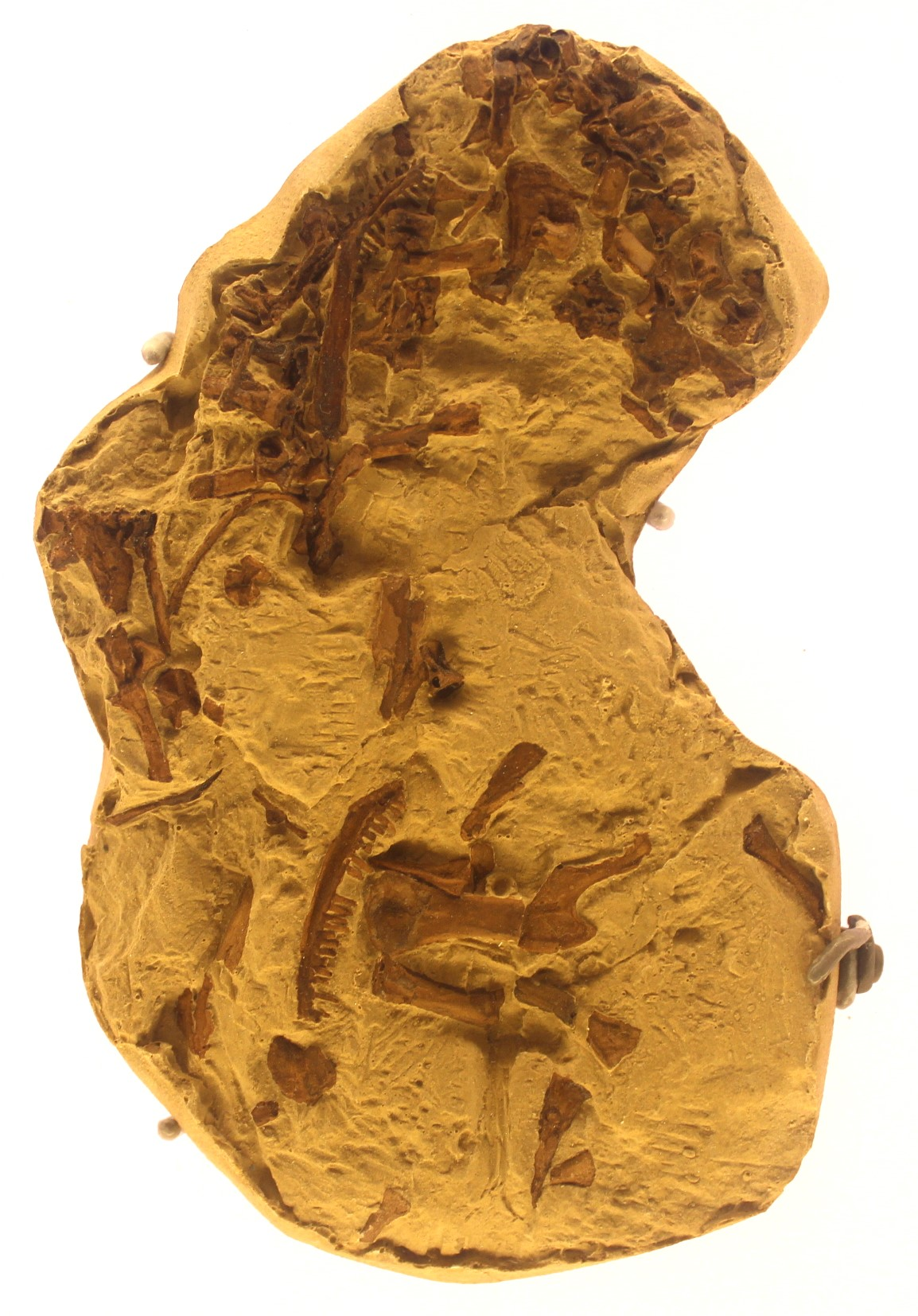
- Echinerpeton intermedium fossil

Scientific classification
- Domain: Eukaryota
- Kingdom: Animalia
- Phylum: Chordata
- Clade: Synapsida
- Clade: Metopophora
- Family: †Ophiacodontidae
- Genus: †Echinerpeton; Reisz, 1972

Type species
- †Echinerpeton intermedium Reisz, 1972

= Echinerpeton =

Echinerpeton Temporal range: Late Carboniferous, 308 Ma

Extinct genus of synapsids

Echinerpeton is an extinct genus of synapsid, including the single species Echinerpeton intermedium from the Late Carboniferous of Nova Scotia, Canada. The name is derived from the Greek words for 'spiny' and 'reptile'. Along with its contemporary Archaeothyris, Echinerpeton is the oldest known synapsid, having lived around 308 million years ago. It is known from six small, fragmentary fossils, which were found in an outcrop of the Morien Group near the town of Florence. The most complete specimen preserves articulated vertebrae with high neural spines, indicating that Echinerpeton was a sail-backed synapsid like the better known Dimetrodon, Sphenacodon, and Edaphosaurus. However, the relationship of Echinerpeton to these other forms is unclear, and its phylogenetic placement among basal synapsids remains uncertain.

== Description ==
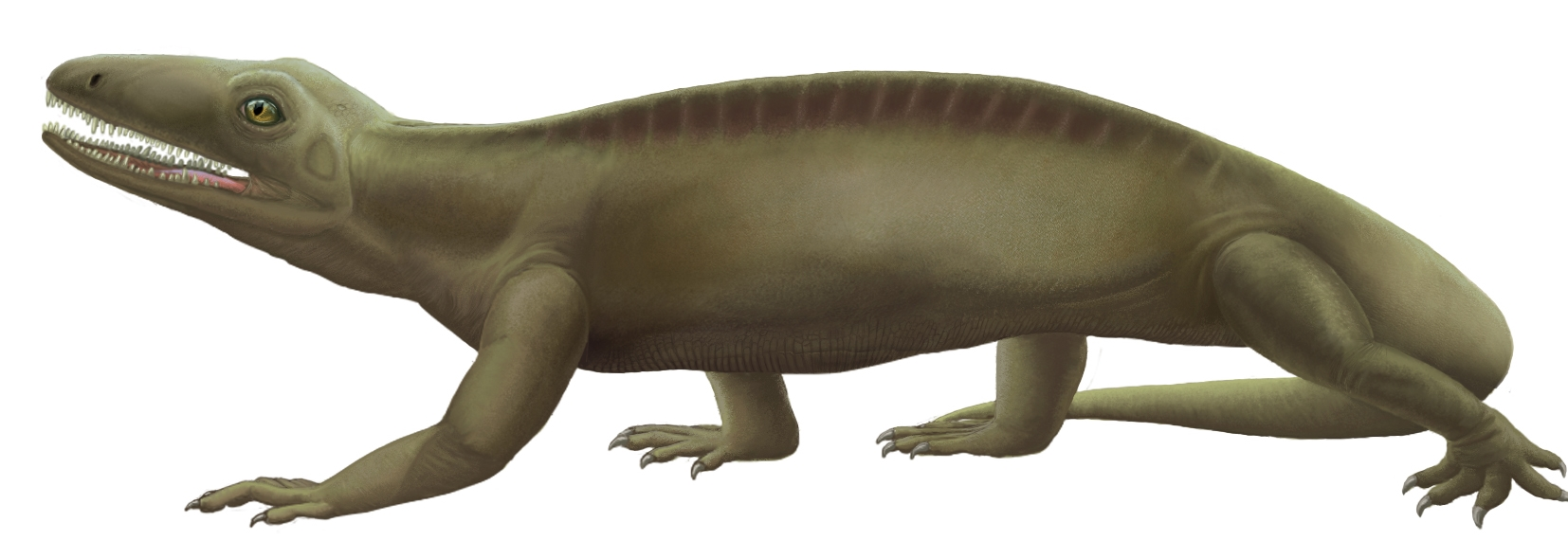
Life restoration

Echinerpeton is known from six specimens, five housed in the Museum of Comparative Zoology and a sixth in the Redpath Museum: the holotype MCZ 4090, which consists of a partial postcranial skeleton and some jaw fragments; MCZ 4091, which includes vertebrae and an interclavicle; MCZ 4092, a left maxilla or upper jaw bone; MCZ 4093, a partial right maxilla; MCZ 4094, including three neural arches or vertebral spines; and RM 10057, consisting of a right maxilla, neural arch, rib, and a phalanx or finger bone. Since all other specimens besides the holotype are isolated bone fragments, their assignment to the same species is not certain. The maxillae are distinct in having straight lower margins, distinct from the often curved jaws of ophiacodontids and sphenacodontids but similar to the straight jaws of some other synapsids like Archaeothyris, Haptodus, and Varanops. The dentary or lower jaw bone has a slight upward curve. The teeth of both the upper and lower jaws are small and cone-shaped, some having slightly serrated edges, and are only differentiated by slight differences in length (some other synapsids have teeth that vary greatly and shape across their jaws). The three forward-most dentary teeth are angled slightly outward as in more derived synapsids such as Dimetrodon and Sphenacodon. Several features, including straight-margined maxillae and simple conical teeth, are also seen in the earliest reptiles. Twenty-three presacral (neck and back) vertebrae are preserved in the holotype, although several may be missing because the typical number of presacral vertebrae in early synapsids is 27. The centra or centers of the vertebrae are slightly compressed, similar to the compression seen in the vertebrae of ophiacodontids. There are large spaces between the centra where bones called intercentra could fit, although no intercentra are preserved in the six Echinerpeton specimens. The loose connection between the centra and intercentra is one of the primitive features of Echinerpeton, since other early synapsids have intercentra that fit tightly with the centra as part of an evolutionary progression toward completely fused vertebral elements. The most prominent feature of the vertebrae of Echinerpeton are their tall neural spines, which can be up to seven times higher than they are wide. They are similar in proportion to the spines of Sphenacodon, although Echinerpeton is considerably smaller in overall size. The neural spines of the holotype are thinnest at their tips, suggesting that MCZ 4090 may have been an immature individual with poorly ossified bones. By contrast, MCZ 4094 has neural spines that are thicker at their tips and are slightly larger in size, both of which are possible indications that the specimen represents an adult individual. The first vertebra preserved in the series, the axis bone, has a neural spine that is low and broad like those of many other synapsids. The axis is most similar to those of ophiacodontids because it widens toward the top, and unlike those of sphenacodontids which widen about midway up the spine and then narrow at the top. To either side of the neural spines are smaller transverse processes, which have struts of bones extending from them that were described as a "webbing." This "webbing" helps connect the vertebrae to the ribs, and is otherwise only seen in ophiacodontids.

Parts of the appendicular skeleton (limbs, hips, and shoulder bones) are preserved in Echinerpeton specimens, including the interclavicle, scapula (shoulder blade), the lower portion of the humerus (upper arm bone), the ilium (a hip bone), the upper portion of the femur (upper leg bone), the tibia and fibula (lower leg bones), astragalus and calcaneum (ankle bones), and metatarsals (foot bones). The ilium of Echinerpeton is similar to those of early reptiles in that it is narrow and backward-pointing, while those of sphenacodontids are widened at their front to support the hip's connection with the sacral vertebrae. The astragalus has the same simple L-shape as those of ophiacodontids.

== Phylogeny ==
Reisz (1972) tentatively classified Echinerpeton as an ophiacodontid in its initial description, but later (1986) considered it an indeterminate "pelycosaur". Lee (1999) argued that the placement of Echinerpeton within Synapsida was not certain because it lacked any of the defining features or synapomorphies present in the group, all of which come from the skull. He claimed that all the features linking Echinerpeton with synapsids were also present in other basal amniotes, so it could not be placed definitively on the synapsid branch of Amniota (the other amniote branch is Sauropsida, or reptiles). Benson (2012) was the first to include Echinerpeton in a phylogenetic analysis, and considered it a "wildcard taxon" because it had three equally likely positions on the synapsid tree: one as the most basal synapsid, another as the sister taxon of a clade containing Caseasauria, Edaphosauridae, and Sphenacodontia, and a third as an ophiacodontid more derived than Archaeothyris. Benson also found that the inclusion of Echinerpeton in his analysis was causing large polytomies, or unresolved relationships, in the strict consensus tree. Mann and Patterson (2019) described new material of Echinerpeton, including substantial cranial remains, and recovered it as a member of Ophiacodontidae.
