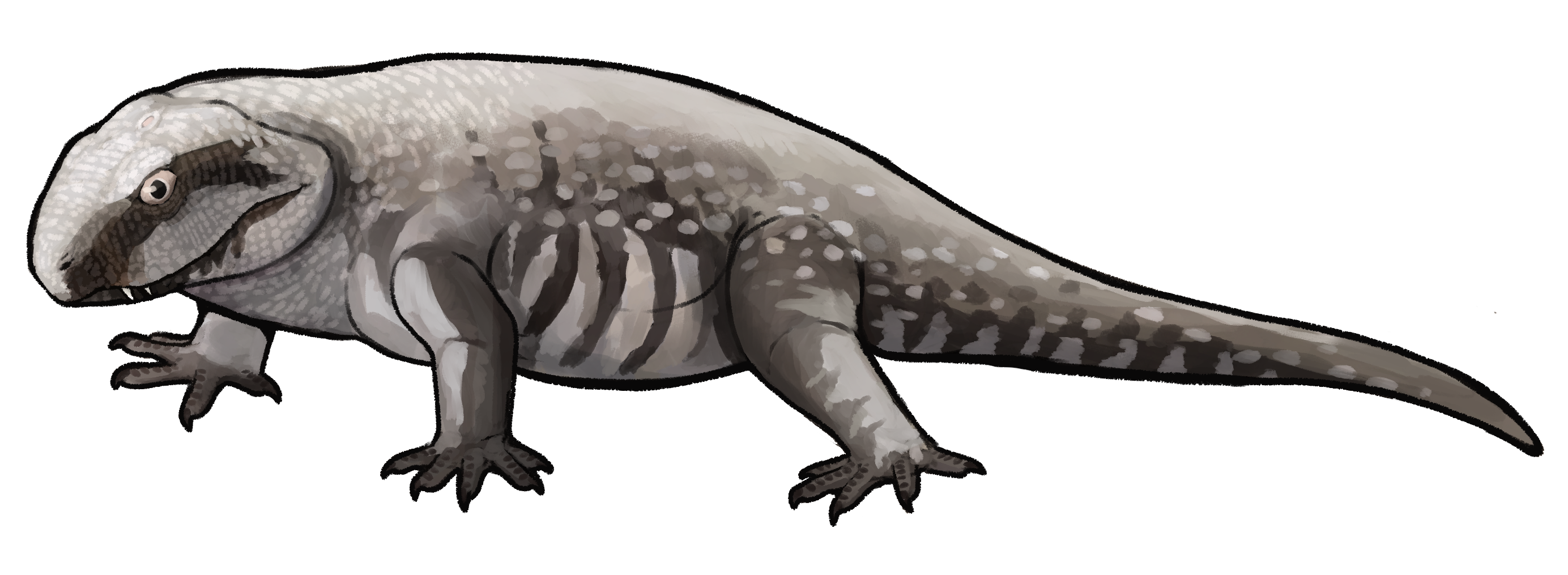
- Life restoration of Eothyris parkeyi; trunk shape is conjectural

Scientific classification
- Kingdom: Animalia
- Phylum: Chordata
- Clade: Synapsida
- Clade: †Caseasauria
- Family: †Eothyrididae; Romer and Price, 1940

Genera
- ?Asaphestera; Vaughnictis; Oedaleops; Eothyris

= Eothyrididae =

Eothyrididae Temporal range: Early Permian, 299–279.5 Ma

Extinct family of synapsids

Eothyrididae is an extinct family of very primitive, insectivorous synapsids. Only three genera are known, Eothyris, Vaughnictis and Oedaleops, all from the early Permian of North America. Their main distinguishing feature is the large caniniform tooth in front of the maxilla.

Eothyridids share with the Caseidae a number of specialised features associated with the morphology of the snout and external naris and it is likely that their common ancestor was close in build to Eothyris. The two together form the clade Caseasauria.

Eothyris is known from a single skull specimen; Oedaleops is known from three partial skulls and some parts of some limbs. Vaughnictis is known from a partial skull, six dorsal vertebrae and some hind-limb bones. The skulls are approximately six centimeters in length, suggesting that the total length of the animals was under one meter.

The species were found in the lower Permian in what is today North America. In modern cladistics, the Eothyrididae are considered to be a basal group within the Caseasauria. Caseasauria forms a sister group of the Eupelycosauria, out of which the therapsids evolved.

== See also ==
- Evolution of mammals
