= Archaeothyris =

Archaeothyris Temporal range: Late Carboniferous, 306 Ma
- Known skull remains of Archaeothyris

Scientific classification
- Kingdom: Animalia
- Phylum: Chordata
- Clade: Synapsida
- Family: †Ophiacodontidae
- Genus: †Archaeothyris; Reisz, 1972

Type species
- †Archaeothyris florensis Reisz, 1972

Extinct genus of synapsids

Archaeothyris is an extinct genus of ophiacodontid synapsid that lived during the Late Carboniferous and is known from Nova Scotia. Dated to 306 million years ago, Archaeothyris, along with a more poorly known synapsid called Echinerpeton, are the oldest undisputed synapsids known. The name means ancient window (Greek), and refers to the opening in the skull, the temporal fenestra, which indicates this is an early synapsid. Protoclepsydrops also from Nova Scotia is slightly older but is known by very fragmentary materials.

== Description ==
Archaeothyris was more advanced than the early sauropsids, having strong jaws that could open wider than those of the early reptiles. While its sharp teeth were all of the same size & shape, it did possess a pair of enlarged canines, suggesting that it was a carnivore.

Archaeothyris's legs were articulated laterally at its pelvis and shoulders, which gave it a sprawling stance. The first toe is smaller than the second.

== Classification ==
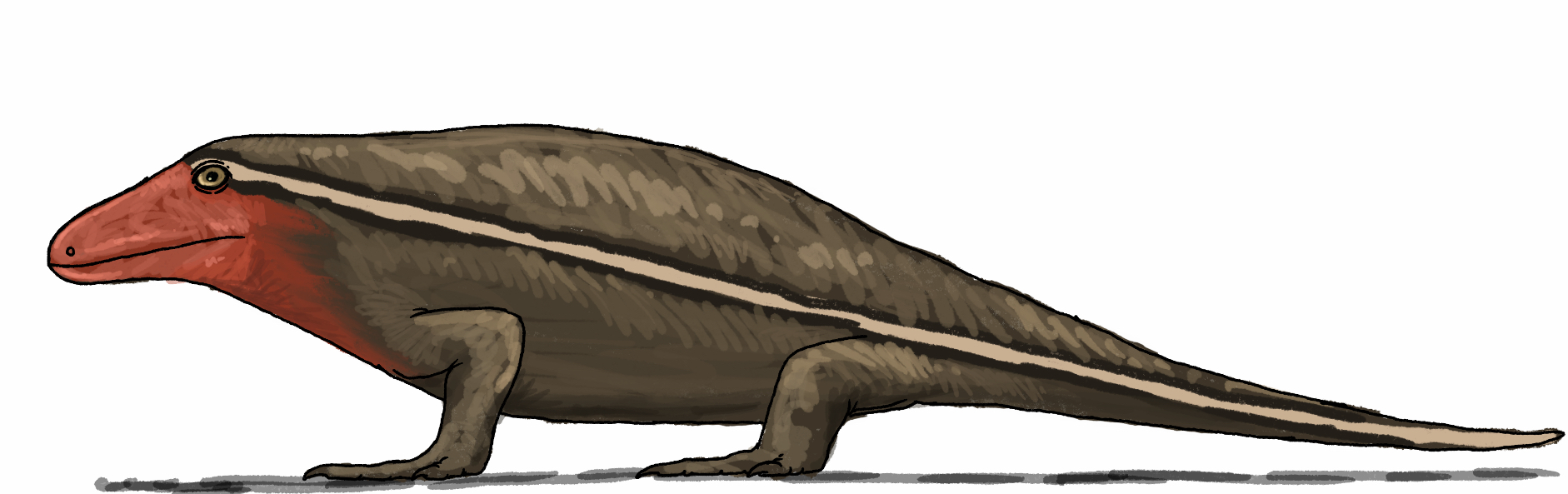
Life restoration of Archaeothyris

Archaeothyris belonged to the family Ophiacodontidae, a group of early pelycosaurs that evolved early in the Late Carboniferous. It was one of the earliest and most basal synapsids (the group which includes mammals).

Below is a cladogram modified from the analysis of Benson (2012):

- - Tseajaia campi
  - Limnoscelis paludis
  - Amniota
    - - Captorhinus spp.
      - Protorothyris archeri
    - Synapsida
      - - Caseasauria
        - - Ianthodon schultzei
          - - Edaphosauridae
            - Sphenacodontia
      - - Varanopidae
        - Ophiacodontidae
          - Archaeothyris florensis
          - - Varanosaurus acutirostris
            - - Ophiacodon spp.
              - Stereophallodon ciscoensis

== Discovery and paleoecology ==
Fossils of Archaeothyris were first described in 1972 from the Joggins Fossil Cliffs, the same locality in which the early reptiles Hylonomus and Petrolacosaurus (both of which resemble Archaeothyris) were found.

Archaeothyris lived in what is now Nova Scotia, about 306 million years ago in the Carboniferous Period (Pennsylvanian). Nova Scotia at this time was a coal forest. The "trees" (actually giant club mosses) were very tall, some, such as Lepidodendron, up to 50 metres (164 ft) tall. Archaeothyris and the other early amniotes lived in the moist vegetation on the forest ground, together with the more terrestrially adapted labyrinthodont amphibians.

== See also ==
- List of pelycosaurs
- Evolution of mammals
- List of transitional fossils
- Carboniferous tetrapods
