= List of Carboniferous tetrapods =

Amphibians and reptiles of the period

Carboniferous tetrapods include amphibians and reptiles that lived during the Carboniferous Period. Though stem-tetrapods originated in the preceding Devonian, it was in the earliest Carboniferous that the first crown tetrapods appeared, with full scaleless skin and five digits.

During this time, amphibians (including many extinct groups unrelated to modern forms, referred to as "basal tetrapods") were the predominant tetrapods, and included the Temnospondyli, Lepospondyli, and Anthracosauria. The first amniotes appeared during the middle Carboniferous (Early Pennsylvanian) from the lattermost group, and included both sauropsids and synapsids, but it was not until the very end of the Carboniferous, during a rainforest collapse, and afterwards that they began to diversify.

== Classification ==
The following list of families of Carboniferous tetrapods is based mostly on Benton ed. 1993. The classification follows Benton 2004:

Superclass Tetrapoda

- Basal Tetrapods
  - Family Whatcheeriidae
  - Family Crassigyrinidae
  - Family Baphetidae (Loxommatidae)
  - Family Colosteidae
  - Family Caerorhachidae
- Class Amphibia
  - Order Temnospondyli
    - Family Dendrerpetontidae
    - Family Cochleosauridae
    - Family Trimerorhachidae
    - Family Eugyrinidae
    - Family Saurerpetontidae
    - Family Eryopidae
    - Family Trematopidae
    - Family Dissorophidae
    - Family Micromelerpetontidae
    - Family Branchiosauridae
    - Family Amphibamidae
  - Superorder Lepospondyli
    - Incertae Sedis
      - Family Acherontiscidae
      - Family Adelogyrinidae
    - Order Aïstopoda
      - Family Ophiderpetontidae
      - Family Phlegethontiidae
    - Order Nectridea
      - Family Diplocaulidae
      - Family Scincosauridae
      - Family Urocordylidae
    - Order Microsauria
      - Utaherpeton
      - Family Microbrachidae
      - Family Hyloplesiontidae
      - Family Odonterpetontidae
      - Family Tuditanidae
      - Family Pantylidae
      - Family Gymnarthridae
      - Family Trihecatontidae
      - Family Cocytinidae
    - Superorder Reptiliomorpha
      - Order/suborder uncertain (incerti (sub)ordinis)
        - Family Solenodonsauridae
        - Westlothiana
      - Order Anthracosauria
        - Family Eoherpetontidae
        - Family Proterogyrinidae
        - Family Anthracosauridae
        - Family Eogyrinidae
        - Family Archeriidae
      - Order Gephyrostegida
        - Family Gephyrostegidae
      - Order Seymouriamorpha
        - Family Discosauriscidae
      - Order Diadectomorpha
        - Family Limnoscelididae
        - Family Diadectidae

Series Amniota

- Class Sauropsida
  - Basal Eureptilia
    - Family Captorhinidae
    - Family Protorothyrididae
  - Subclass Diapsida
    - Order Araeoscelidia
      - Family Petrolacosauridae
- Class Synapsida
  - Order Pelycosauria
    - Family Varanopidae
    - Family Ophiacodontidae
    - Family Edaphosauridae
    - Family Sphenacodontidae

== See also ==
- List of Permian tetrapods
- List of Devonian tetrapods
