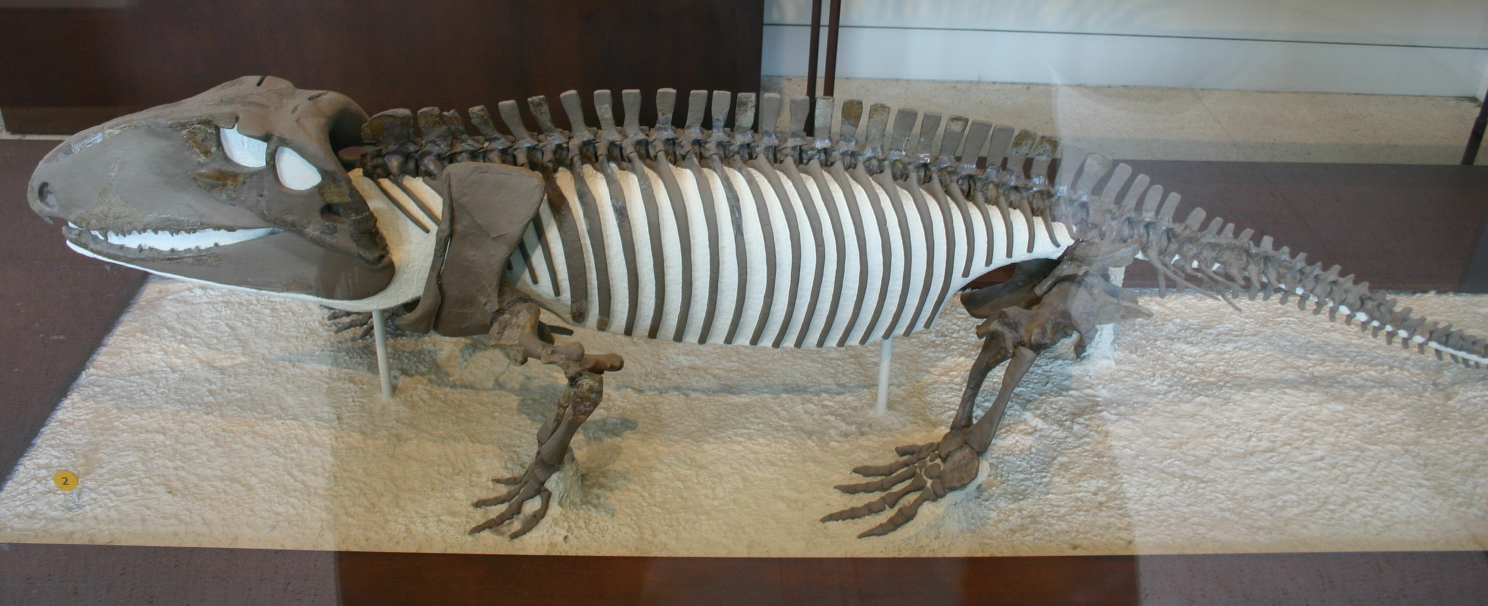
- Mounted skeleton of Ophiacodon retroversus in the American Museum of Natural History

Scientific classification
- Kingdom: Animalia
- Phylum: Chordata
- Clade: Synapsida
- Clade: Metopophora
- Family: †Ophiacodontidae; Nopcsa, 1923

Subgroups
- †Archaeothyris; †Baldwinonus; †Clepsydrops; †Echinerpeton; †Ophiacodon; †Protoclepsydrops?; †Stereophallodon; †Stereorachis; †Varanosaurus

= Ophiacodontidae =

Ophiacodontidae Temporal range: Late Carboniferous to Early Permian 308–278 Ma

Extinct family of synapsids

Ophiacodontidae is an extinct family of early eupelycosaurs from the Carboniferous and Permian. Archaeothyris, and Clepsydrops were among the earliest ophiacodontids, appearing in the Late Carboniferous. Ophiacodontids are among the most basal synapsids, an offshoot of the lineage which includes therapsids and their descendants, the mammals. The group was thought to have gone extinct by the Kungurian, although some experts suggest a possibility of the family persisting into the Roadian, replaced by anomodonts, theriodonts, and the diapsid reptiles.

== Characteristics ==
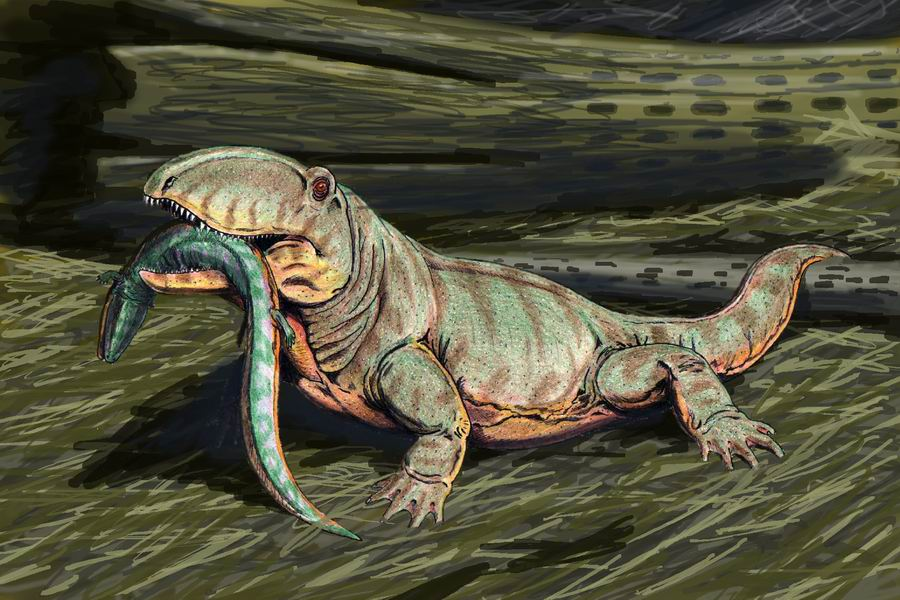
Ophiacodon mirus restoration.

The lifestyle of ophiacodonts has long been controversial. Some studies suggested that they were semi-aquatic, and some even suggested a fairly aquatic lifestyle, but a recent study based on a quantitative inference model suggested that both Clepsydrops and Ophiacodon were terrestrial. Vertebral morphometric data also support, though ambiguously, a rather terrestrial lifestyle for Ophiacodon, which could reach a length of 3.6 m (12 ft). Archaeothyris may also have been terrestrial, but no detailed study of its habitat has been performed so far. The earliest ophiacodontids resembled varanids in body proportions, while others were larger with elongated skulls and massive shoulder girdles, probably to provide muscle attachment to support the weight of the large head.

== Classification ==
Traditionally, Archaeothyris, Ophiacodon, Varanosaurus and the briefly described Baldwinonus, Clepsydrops, Echinerpeton, Stereophallodon and Stereorhachis are included in the Ophiacodontidae. Protoclepsydrops was also regarded as ophiacodontid, however there is debate as to whether or not it was a synapsid. Echinerpeton and Sterophallodon were included for the first time in a phylogenetic analysis by Benson (2012). Echinerpeton was found to be a wildcard taxon due to its small amount of known materials. It occupies three possible positions, falling either as the most basal synapsid, as the sister taxon of Caseasauria plus more derived taxa, or as an ophiacodontid more derived than Archaeothyris. Below is a cladogram modified from the analysis of Benson (2012), after the exclusion of Echinerpeton:

- - Tseajaia campi
  - Limnoscelis paludis
  - Amniota
    - - Captorhinus spp.
      - Protorothyris archeri
    - Synapsida
      - - Caseasauria
        - - Ianthodon schultzei
          - - Edaphosauridae
            - Sphenacodontia
      - - Ophiacodontidae
          - Archaeothyris florensis
          - - Varanosaurus acutirostris
            - - Ophiacodon spp.
              - Stereophallodon ciscoensis
        - Varanopidae
          - Archaeovenator hamiltonensis
          - - Pyozia mesenensis
            - - - Mycterosaurus longiceps
                - - ?Elliotsmithia longiceps (BP/1/5678)
                  - Heleosaurus scholtzi
                  - Mesenosaurus romeri
              - - - Varanops brevirostris
                  - - Watongia meieri
                    - Varanodon agilis
                - - Ruthiromia elcobriensis
                  - - Aerosaurus wellesi
                    - Aerosaurus greenleorum
