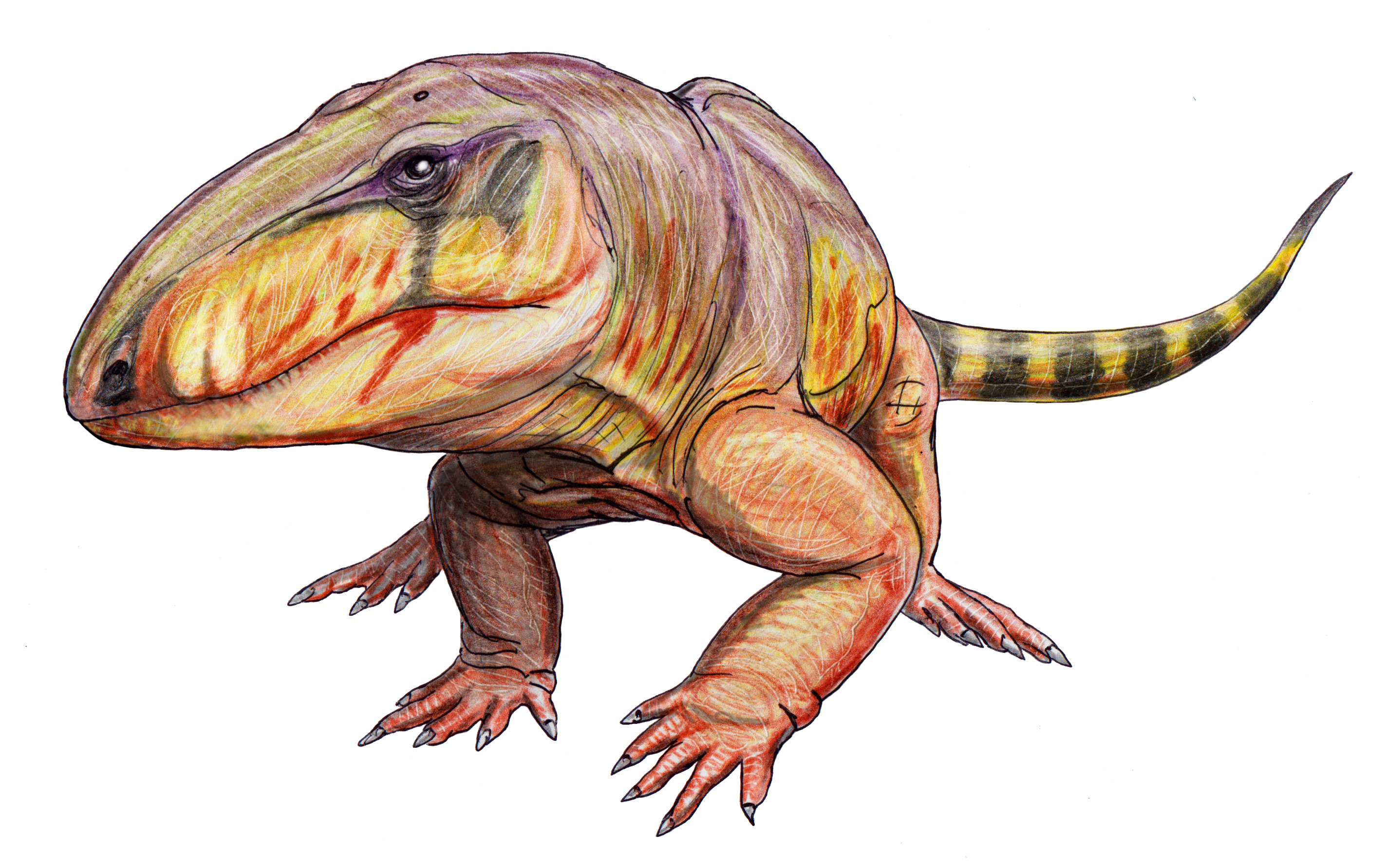
- Restoration

Scientific classification
- Domain: Eukaryota
- Kingdom: Animalia
- Phylum: Chordata
- Clade: Synapsida
- Family: †Ophiacodontidae
- Genus: †Stereophallodon; Romer, 1937

Type species
- Stereophallodon ciscoensis Romer, 1937

= Stereophallodon =

Stereophallodon Temporal range: Permian

Extinct genus of synapsids

Stereophallodon is an extinct genus of non-mammalian synapsids.

== See also ==
- List of pelycosaurs

== Bibliography ==
- A. S. Romer. 1937. New genera and species of pelycosaurian reptiles. Proceedings of the New England Zoölogical Club 16:89-95
- Brinkman, D. & Eberth, D.A., 1986, The anatomy and relationships of Stereophallodon and Baldwinonus (Reptilia, Pelycosauria): Breviora, no. 485, p. 34.
