= Dendromaia =

Dendromaia Temporal range: Late Moscovian, 309–306 Ma

Scientific classification
- Kingdom: Animalia
- Phylum: Chordata
- Clade: Synapsida
- Family: †Varanopidae
- Genus: †Dendromaia; Maddin, Mann, & Hebert, 2019

Type species
- †Dendromaia unamakiensis Maddin, Mann, & Hebert, 2020

Extinct genus of lizard-like animals

Dendromaia is an extinct genus of varanopid from the Carboniferous of Nova Scotia. It contains a single species, Dendromaia unamakiensis. Dendromaia is the oldest known varanopid and the only one found in Nova Scotia. Known from a large partial skeleton preserved with its tail wrapped around a much smaller partial skeleton, Dendromaia may also represent the oldest known occurrence of parental care in the fossil record. While the larger skeleton possessed certain mycterosaurine-like features, the smaller skeleton resembled basal varanopids such as Archaeovenator and Pyozia, creating uncertainty over whether characteristics at the base of Varanopidae have legitimate phylogenetic significance or instead reflect the immaturity of basal varanopid specimens.

== Discovery ==
Dendromaia unamakiensis is known from a slab and counterslab containing two skeletons. The specimen, NSM017GF020.001, was discovered in a petrified lycopod stump at Point Aconi on Cape Breton Island in Nova Scotia. This site is part of the Sydney Mines Formation, which is dated to the late Moscovian stage of the Carboniferous period, 309-306 million years ago. "Dendromaia" roughly translates to "the mother in the tree", according to its discovery in a stump and proposed parental care. The specific name references Unama'kik, the Mi'kmaq name for Cape Breton Island. The genus and species were described by Hillary Maddin, Arjan Mann, and Brian Hebert in 2019. Hebert had discovered the specimen in 2017.

The two skeletons had different sizes and preserved different areas, with the larger skeleton (designated the holotype) incorporating a large portion of the rear half of the body and the smaller skeleton (designated the paratype) including a skull and only fragments of the postcranium, 1/4th the size of the larger one. These skeletons were inferred to represent two individuals of a single new taxon based on their similar overlapping anatomy, apparent varanopid ancestry, close association, and the fact that there are no other varanopids known from Nova Scotia.

== Description ==
The 6 preserved dorsal vertebrae of the larger skeleton were among the most characteristic bones in the animal. They shared several traits with Mycterosaurus, such as tall rectangular neural spines with slight depressions at their base. However, the rib facets at the tip of the transverse processes were not vertical, but instead oriented diagonally. Like other non-varanodontine varanopids, the lower edge of each centrum had a rounded keel. 10 incomplete caudal vertebrae preserved on the counterpart were elongated and had low neural spines. Holocephalous (single-headed) ribs and Heleosaurus-like gastralia were also present, though osteoderms were seemingly absent. The plate-like bones composing the pelvis were not fused to each other, and Dendromaia had a large pubic foramen like that of Heleosaurus. The femur was lightly-built and twisted, similar to mycterosaurines. The rest of the leg and foot was present but incomplete. The larger specimen may have been 20 to 30 centimeters (7.9-12 inches) long from the tip of the snout to the base of the tail, and its full tail length is unknown but likely elongated.

The small skeleton's poorly-preserved skull was triangular and pointed like those of Archaeovenator, Pyozia, and Heleosaurus. It had thin, curved teeth on the maxilla (without a canine region) and smaller teeth on the palate, which also possessed a varanopid-like pterygoid and cultriform process. Isolated hyoid bones were also identifiable. Like the larger skeleton, the small skeleton's vertebrae had a rounded keel on their underside. It also possessed several limb bone fragments, including a twisted humerus.

== Classification ==
Dendromaia is the oldest member of a family of amniotes known as varanopids. Varanopids are traditionally considered early synapsids (part of the lineage of amniotes leading to mammals), although some studies alternatively propose that they are diapsid reptiles related to Orovenator. The describers of Dendromaia prefer a position for varanopids among synapsids, citing both biological characteristics (parental care) and arguing that traits which link varanopids to diapsids may be based on oversampling of juvenile specimens at the base of Varanopidae. Recent studies from the early 2020s also support their traditional placement as synapsids on the basis of high degree of bone labyrinth ossification, maxillary canal morphology and phylogenetic analyses.

To investigate the position of Dendromaia among other varanopids, the describers adapted a phylogenetic analysis matrix previously utilized by Brocklehurst & Fröbisch (2018). The resulting strict consensus tree (average result of most parsimonious trees) of the parsimony analysis placed Dendromaia in a polytomy near the base of Varanopidae, along with Pyozia and a clade which forks into Varanodontinae and Mycterosaurinae. The Bayesian analysis recovers a similar result, albeit with the polytomy resolved, placing Dendromaia as the sister taxon to Pyozia. The following cladogram is based on the results of the Bayesian analysis in Maddin, Mann, & Hebert (2019):

- Varanopidae
  - Archaeovenator hamiltonensis
  - - Apsisaurus witteri
    - - - Dendromaia unamakiensis
        - Pyozia mesenensis
      - - Mycterosaurinae
          - Mycterosaurus longiceps
          - - Mesenosaurus romeri
            - - Heleosaurus scholtzi
              - Elliotsmithia longiceps? (BP/1/5678)
        - Varanodontinae
          - - Varanops brevirostris
            - - Watongia meieri
              - Varanodon agilis
          - - Aerosaurus wellesi
            - - Aerosaurus greenleorum
              - Ruthiromia elcobriensis

== Paleobiology ==
The delicate preservation of the skeletons indicated that they likely died and were quickly buried at the same place and time. They were positioned with the smaller skeleton encircled by the tail of the larger skeleton. These taphonomic qualities led the paleontologists who described them to propose that the two skeletons were denning together under the roots of a lycopod tree, with the smaller skeleton likely representing the offspring of the larger skeleton. This may be the oldest fossil evidence of parental care, predating the previously oldest evidence, an aggregation of varanopids from the Permian of South Africa which may represent their own species (Microvaranops parentis) or specimens of Heleosaurus scholtzi. On the other hand, it remains a possibility that the two skeletons were not close relatives, and instead simply sheltered from a storm in the same stump. The anatomy of the juvenile Dendromaia skeleton is remarkably similar to that of basal varanopids such as Archaeovenator and Pyozia, indicating that these genera may be based on juvenile specimens of larger varanopids. Likewise, certain characteristics (such as reduced dentition and limb development) found to link basal varanopids with diapsids may be a consequence of juvenile specimen sampling, rather than valid phylogenetic signals.
