= Tambacarnifex =

Tambacarnifex Temporal range: Artinskian ~290–284 Ma

Scientific classification
- Kingdom: Animalia
- Phylum: Chordata
- Clade: Synapsida
- Family: †Varanopidae
- Subfamily: †Varanopinae
- Genus: †Tambacarnifex; Berman et al., 2013

Type species
- †Tambacarnifex unguifalcatus Berman et al., 2013

Extinct genus of tetrapods

Tambacarnifex (meaning "Tambach butcher") is an extinct genus of varanodontine synapsids known from the Early Permian Tambach Formation of Free State of Thuringia, central Germany. It was first named by David S. Berman, Amy C. Henrici, Stuart S. Sumida, Thomas Martens and Valerie Pelletier in 2013 and the type species is Tambacarnifex unguifalcatus. Its body length is estimated at 1 metre (39 in) in length.

Below is a simplified version of the cladogram found by Berman et al., 2013.

- Varanopidae
  - Archaeovenator
  - - Mycterosaurinae
      - Heleosaurus
      - - Elliotsmithia
        - - Mycterosaurus
          - Mesenosaurus
    - Varanodontinae
      - Aerosaurus
      - - - Watongia
          - Varanodon
        - - Varanops
          - Tambacarnifex
