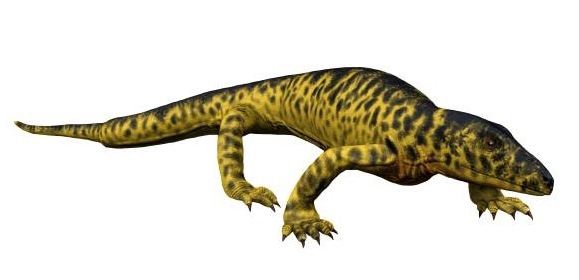
- Life restoration of Mycterosaurus longcipes

Scientific classification
- Kingdom: Animalia
- Phylum: Chordata
- Clade: Synapsida
- Family: †Varanopidae
- Subfamily: †Mycterosaurinae
- Genus: †Mycterosaurus; Williston, 1915

Type species
- †Mycterosaurus longiceps Williston, 1915

= Mycterosaurus =

Mycterosaurus Temporal range: Early Permian, 290.1–272.5 Ma

Extinct genus of tetrapods

Mycterosaurus (Greek as mykter/mykteros meaning nose/snout, sauros meaning "lizard") is an extinct genus of amniotes belonging to the family Varanopidae. It is classified in the varanopid subfamily Mycterosaurinae. Mycterosaurus is the most primitive member of its family, existing from 290.1 to 272.5 MYA, known to Texas and Oklahoma. It lacks some features that its advanced relatives have.

Mycterosaurus is a relatively small carnivore, estimated to be around 60 cm (23 inches) long with synonyms of Eumatthevia bolli, and possibly Basicranodon fortsillensis. Restored, Mycterosaurus appears spindly and grotesque in contrast to the majority of "pelycosaurs" in its proportions and especially unlike edaphosaurids, which are commonly stocky in build.

The number of valid Mycterosaurus species have varied over the years, with a total of two classifications of Mycterosaurus longiceps and Mycterosaurus smithae. However, recent analysis has led to a re-description of Mycterosaurus smithae.

== Description ==
=== Skull ===
Both the holotype and AMNH 7002 "Eumatthevia" have been studied and restudied, with additions and modifications to the cranial description. The nares and orbit of Mycterosaurus are unusually large, with the orbit directed outwardly and circular in manner. The extremely large size of the orbit has been associated with the relatively small size of the animal. Additionally, the surface of the supraoccipital that articulates with the parietals dorsally above are cartilaginous, a condition found in that of crocodiles, lizards, and dinosaurs. The exoccipitals surround the foramen magnum and are loosely attached in a similar fashion to Dimetrodon. The parietal foramen is situated almost at the extreme posterior end of the parietals and is very close to the dermosupraoccipitals. The parietal itself is slightly separated on each side from the squamoso-postorbital arch while the squamosal covers the quadate broadly.

=== Dentition ===
Mycterosaurus possesses 18-20 maxillary teeth that are characteristically different from those of Varanops, Ophiacaodon, Dimetrodon, or Edaphosaurus. The teeth are stout at the base, with slightly recurved and sharp points. The first four to five maxillary teeth (anterior) are the largest at the primitive position of the canines. These teeth are moderately elongated, flattened, and present an obtuse apex. The premaxillary and maxillary teeth are typical thecodont teeth. The prevomers presented with a longitudinal row of small teeth and were long and slender in character. The lower teeth appear to be rather small and isodont, but otherwise unknown due to fossil conditions. In addition to maxillary teeth, Mycterosaurus presents small, but numerous palatal teeth. The pterygoids, on both anterior and middle aspects, show a considerable number of small pointed teeth. The marginal teeth are serrated on the mesial and distal edges.

=== Post-cranial Skeleton ===
The vertebrae are similar to that of Varanops, with a thin spine that was no more than 2-3 times in height the centrum. While the cervicals are unknown due to poor fossil records, details from the posterior aspect are somewhat preserved. The neural spine is low and broad in both anterior and posterior direction. The centra has rounded ends and no ventral keel, possessing a characteristic edaphosaurioid spool shape. Additionally, the dorsal centra is moderately elongate (5 units in length). In contrast, the lumbar centras are much shorter.

The scapula is short and not particularly broad, in contrast to the exceptionally broad procoracoid plate, a feature of edaphosaurids. The glenoid surface is short, and the supraglenoid foramen is absent. The pelvis has extreme elongation at the anterior end of the iliac blade with the anterior expansion being greater than the posterior. The humerus and hind leg bones are slender, with no ectepicondylar foramen.

The astragalus is L-shaped and the centrum is circular when viewed in ventral view. These observations are consistent with most pelycosaurian grade synapsids. The fourth distal tarsal is enlarged, with its proximal articular surface facing the convex. The convex is articulated by the astragalus-calcaneum complex. This morphology indicates a highly mobile mesotarsal joint in both Varanops and Mycterosaurus, contrasting earlier beliefs that little movement was present in early synapsids. These observations serve as evidence to suggest that Varanops and Mycterosaurus used a semidigitigrade stance to ambulate.

== Discovery ==
The first Mycterosaurus skull ever discovered was that of Mycterosaurus longiceps. The holotype (FMNH-UC 692) was discovered by Mr. Herman Douthitt in 1915 at a deposit of the Lower Permian (Leonardian) Clyde Formation of north-central Texas. Samuel Wendell Williston analyzed the holotype, describing the skull and other fragmented portions of the skeleton in his publication A New Genus and Species of American Theromorpha.

In 1930, R Broom identified an unstudied fossil collected by Jacob Boll at the American Museum that he believed had been wrongly labeled by collectors as a small labyrinthodont. The fossil, AMNH 7002, consisted of a fragmentary skull and partially crushed skeleton. Broom named the fossil Eumatthevia Bolli after the late American paleontologist Professor W.D. Matthew. Broom noted that the skull of the fossil appeared similar to that of other primitive theromorphs such as Glaucosaurus and Mycterosaurus, but that it appeared more slenderly built and presented a flatter skull compared to Mycterosaurus. Despite this difference, an independent junior author's restoration differed in no aspects from Mycterosaurus except that the skull was lower, a difference attributed to crushing. As such, Romer concluded that Eumatthevia bolli was surely a synonym of Mycterosaurus longiceps.

In 1940, Romer and Price reviewed both aforementioned fossil records in their review of pelycosaurs. The authors note both specimens were affected by different types of crushing, making it difficult to accurately assess the true nature of the skull. However, Romer and Price estimate the true proportions were likely an intermediate between the narrow shape Williston observed and the broad low type restored by Broom. The authors failed to observe contacts between the lacrimal and jugal, ventral of the orbit, as described by Williston and Broom. Additionally, the authors believe defining features of height, pineal size, and teeth differentiated "Eumatthevia" and "Mycterosaurus" were inaccurate. Instead, these differences were likely due to crushing and inaccuracies of measurement by Williston. There is, however, agreement on the large size of the quadratojugal and orbits through all reports.

In 1957, Peter Paul Vaughn published a paper describing the features of a pelycosaur named Basicranodon fortsillensis that he believed carried very similar features to the Caseidae. However, Romer had previously established that Mycterosaurus should be classified as an edaphosaur. In 1966, the US Geographic Survey published a paper stating that Basicranodon fortsillensis could well belong to Mycterosaurus if better preserved specimens were ever discovered.

In 1953, a new fossil (MCZ 2985), was discovered in Colorado and in 1964 named by Lewis and Vaughn as a new species that they called Mycterosaurus smithae, after Mrs Stockton Smith. Features on MCZ 2985 such as the measurements of the orbit, temporal region, interorbital width, parietal region, and posteroventral corner of the cheek that matched that of Mycterosaurus longiceps led Lewis and Vaughn to their designation of a new Mycterosaurus species.

However, a reexamination conducted by Brocklehurst et al (2016) using synchrotron radiation micro-computed tomography revealed observations that prompted the authors to reclassify Mycterosaurus smithae into genus Vaughnictis. The additional preparation and synchrotron scanning showed a lack of slender femur, serrated lateral dentition, teeth present on the coronoid, or a lateral boss on the postorbital, these being the most unambiguous varanopid and Mycterosaurine synapomorphies.

== Classification ==
At the time of discovery of the holotype Mycterosaurus longiceps in 1915, it was believed by Mr. Herman Douthitt that the holotype belonged to the genus Varanops due to the similar shape and general characters between the holotype and genus Varanops. However, further analysis of the holotype by Samuel Wendell Williston, led Williston to propose classification of the type as a new species and genus of American Theromorpha. This matched R. Broom's analysis of Eumatthevia Bolli, which revealed a similar conclusion that Eumatthevia Bolli should be classified as a primitive Theromorpha. One should note for clarification that Romer and Price concluded that Mycterosaurus longiceps is synonymous with the Eumatthevia Bolli in their 1940 analysis.

Romer and Price, via their observations of Eumatthevia Bolli and the holotype, concluded that Mycterosaurus longiceps belonged as a primitive form of edaphosaurs. Romer and Price believed that while M. longiceps did not present some features characteristic of advanced edaphosaurs, M. longiceps most certainly exhibited a number of key characteristics that point to its classification as a edaphosaur. Specifically, Romer and Price created the Edaphosauria suborder family Nitosauridae within which genus Mycterosaurus and Nitosaurus reside.

In 1982, Berman and Reisz rejected the family Nitosauride and suggested Mycterosaurus longiceps as a primitive member of the family Varanopidae. Berman and Reisz believed the most important edaphosaur features cited by Romer and Price were mistakenly recorded from an isolated specimen piece that had been confused and misidentified. Rather, Berm and Reisz concluded the misidentified specimen was not a pelycosaur as Romer and Price had believed, but rather a temnospondyl amphibian. As a result, Berman and Reisz re-examined all known M. longiceps specimens which led them to the conclusion that Mycterosaurus is best interpreted as a member of the family Varanopidae.

Phylogenetic analysis of varanopoid interrelationships in 2006 placed Mycterosaurus under Mycterosaurinae with a sister genus of Mesenosaurus.

Below is a cladogram modified from the analysis of Benson (in press), after the exclusion of Basicranodon:

- - Tseajaia campi
  - Limnoscelis paludis
  - Amniota
    - - Captorhinus spp.
      - Protorothyris archeri
    - Synapsida
      - - Caseasauria
        - - Ianthodon schultzei
          - - Edaphosauridae
            - Sphenacodontia
      - - Ophiacodontidae
          - Archaeothyris florensis
          - - Varanosaurus acutirostris
            - - Ophiacodon spp.
              - Stereophallodon ciscoensis
        - Varanopidae
          - Archaeovenator hamiltonensis
          - - Pyozia mesenensis
            - - Mycterosaurinae
                - Mycterosaurus longiceps
                - - ?Elliotsmithia longiceps (BP/1/5678)
                  - Heleosaurus scholtzi
                  - Mesenosaurus romeri
              - Varanopinae
                - - Varanops brevirostris
                  - - Watongia meieri
                    - Varanodon agilis
                - - Ruthiromia elcobriensis
                  - - Aerosaurus wellesi
                    - Aerosaurus greenleorum

== Paleobiology ==
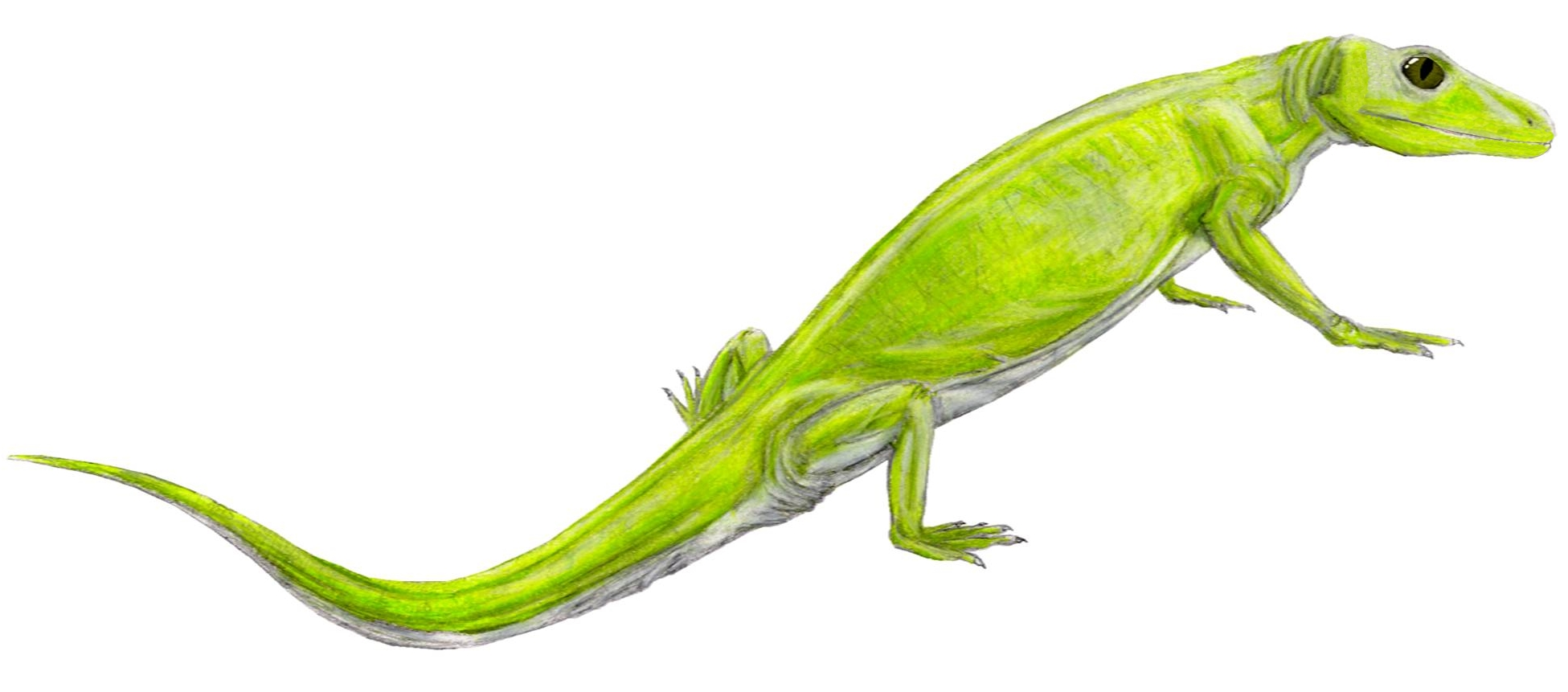
Reconstruction of M. longiceps

Very little has been postulated or hypothesized about the paleobiology of Mycterosaurus due to the small amounts of poorly preserved and incomplete fossil evidence. However, Mycterosaurus is known to be a small, agile faunivore that likely fed off the likes of insects. Possessing a highly mobile mesotarsal joint, Mycterosaurus ambulated with a semi-digitigrade stance.

== Paleoecology ==
Mycterosaurus occupied similar niches throughout their temporal ranges with Mesenosaurus and other relatively small bodied carnivorous lizards. Generally, it appears that small-bodied varanopids such as Mycterosaurus may have successfully occupied similar niches within the trophic networks as relatively small faunivores with no competitive eco-equivalents present until the appearance of small diapsids near the end of the Permian.

== Paleogeography ==
Fossils of Mycterosaurus longiceps have been found in the deposits of the Lower Permian (Leonardian) Clyde Formation of north-central Texas. The Clyde formation belongs to the Wichita group that is almost entirely alternating gray limestone and shale with minuscule amounts of sandstone and siltstone. The Clyde Formation is less known and studied in comparison to other Formations within the Clear Fork Group, such as that of the Arroyo formation. However, the Clyde formation where Mycterosaurus longiceps was discovered appears to present a similar fauna assemblage. This includes Captorhinus, Labidosaurus, Pantylus, Seymouria, Varanops, Casea, as well as several large species of Dimetrodon and Edaphosaurus.

== See also ==
- List of pelycosaurs
- Varanopidae
- Mesenosaurus
- Clyde Formation
