= Ascendonanus =

Ascendonanus Temporal range: Early Permian, ~290 Ma
- Skull of Ascendonanus reconstructed in lateral view

Scientific classification
- Kingdom: Animalia
- Phylum: Chordata
- Clade: Synapsida
- Family: †Varanopidae
- Genus: †Ascendonanus; Spindler et al., 2018

Type species
- †Ascendonanus nestleri Spindler et al., 2018

Extinct genus of varanopid amniote

Ascendonanus (meaning "climbing dwarf") is an extinct genus of amniote from the Early Permian of Germany. It is one of the earliest specialized arboreal (tree-living) tetrapods currently known and outwardly resembled a small lizard. The animal was about 40 cm long, with strongly curved claws, short limbs, a slender, elongated trunk, and a long tail. It would have preyed on insects and other small arthropods.

The small varanopid Eoscansor, recently described from New Mexico, was also adapted to climbing, very likely in trees, but dates from 15 million years earlier during the Pennsylvanian subperiod of the Carboniferous, indicating that climbing amniotes have a longer history and were likely widespread.

Ascendonanus was originally described as a member of the Varanopidae. The taxonomic position of varanopids is currently debated between synapsids (related to mammals, the most widely accepted idea) and diapsids (related to reptiles). The fossils of Ascendonanus are of special scientific importance because they include remains of skin, scales, scutes, bony ossicles, and soft-tissue body outlines, which could indicate that some of the oldest relatives of mammals had a scaly "reptilian-type" appearance if Ascendonanus was a synapsid. Some later studies have suggested that Ascendonanus is a true reptile that is unrelated to varanopids.

== Naming ==
Ascendonanus was named and described in 2018 by Frederik Spindler, Ralf Werneburg, Joerg W. Schneider, Ludwig Luthardt, Volker Annacker and Ronny Rößler from remains of five individuals that were discovered in the Chemnitz petrified forest, an Early Permian tropical fossil forest preserved under the city of Chemnitz, Germany. A Pompeii-like pyroclastic volcanic eruption 291 million years ago buried the forest and created the Zeisigwald Tuff Horizon in the uppermost Leukersdorf Formation (late Sakmarian/early Artinskian transition stage), preserving some of the animals that lived there in exceptional detail in a bottom layer of volcanic ash.

The type species is Ascendonanus nestleri. The generic name is derived from Latin ascendere, "to climb", and nanus, "dwarf". The specific name honors Knut Nestler, a long-time local supporter (deceased in 2016) of the Chemnitz Museum of Natural History (Museum für Naturkunde Chemnitz (MNC)), where the specimens of Ascendonanus are stored.

== Description ==
Ascendonanus was about 40 cm long, although the end of the tail is missing in all specimens and the full body length in life is not currently known. It was originally described as the smallest known member of the clade Varanopidae, a group of early synapsids that generally resembled the unrelated monitor lizards. Features that could identify Ascendonanus as a "pelycosaur" grade synapsid and a member of the Varanopidae include a single lateral temporal opening (fenestra) in the skull, a ridge on the underside of the centra of the vertebrae, and enlarged blades on the ilium of the pelvis. However, the classification of Ascendonanus as a varanopid synapsid was challenged in a recent paper that placed it with neoreptilians.

=== Specimens ===
The five recovered fossils of Ascendonanus are strongly compacted and were split open as flattened counterslabs that revealed articulated partial or near complete skeletons with remains of soft tissue and some internal features. The bone material itself, however, often was not clearly preserved, making interpretation of some details more difficult. The specimens were CT scanned to reveal additional information. Based on the ossification of different bones, all individuals appear to be fully grown despite some differences in size.

The specimen designated MNC-TA0924 was made the diagnostic holotype of Ascendonanus nestleri because it provides the clearest details of the skull. The other four specimens, MNC-TA0147, MNC-TA0269, MNC-TA0906 and MNC-TA1045, were designated as the paratypes. The most remarkable specimen (MNC-TA1045) preserves the clear body outline of nearly the entire animal on counterslabs, showing the thickness in life of the limbs and the neck, and the full covering of scales.

=== Skull ===
Because of compaction over time, it is not known if the skull is relatively flat or if it has a taller profile. The tip of the snout is not well preserved in any specimens. The orbits are very large but the sclerotic rings to support the eyeball are not ossified. Some specimens preserve dozens of tiny round dermal bones or ossicles that were embedded in the skin of the upper eyelid. Such eyelid ossicles are currently not known in any other amniotes, but have been found in some dissorophid temnospondyl amphibians, a non-amniote tetrapod group that is not closely related to synapsids. The eyelid ossicles in Ascendonanus may have evolved independently or may be an ancient feature retained from the earliest tetrapods. Such eyelid ossicles are distinct from the rod-like dermal bones, called palpebral bones, that evolved above the eye socket in a number of later non-synapsid groups, including some ornithischian dinosaurs. The pointed teeth are slender, without flattened cross-sections, serrations, or a cutting edge, and are moderately recurved in the upper jaw and straighter in the lower jaw.

=== Skeleton ===
Ascendonanus differs notably from known varanopids in its elongated trunk section, with 34 to 37 presacral vertebrae compared to 26 in most synapsids. It has a dense set of thin belly ribs or gastralia along the underside. The full length of its tail is not known based on current fossils, but it was longer than in any described varanopids and would have helped with balance in climbing, similar to some tree-living lizards with very long tails. It is unknown whether the distal part of the tail was prehensile.

=== Limbs ===
The forelimbs are almost as long as the hindlimbs, but both pairs of legs are very short compared to the length of the trunk. The elements of the feet are enlarged, with elongated and slender digits. Distinct from described varanopids, the claws on Ascendonanus have a very strong curvature. The curved claws and the size and shape of the feet, including a longer fourth digit on the manus and on the pes, indicate Ascendonanus would have been a "clinging" climber rather than a "grasping" climber.

=== Skin and scales ===
The specimens show a regular scale pattern over their bodies, similar to living squamates and archosaurs, suggesting dry, scaly skin was present in the earliest amniotes before the split into synapsids and sauropsids (reptiles) during the Carboniferous Period. The recently discovered body impressions of resting synapsid sphenacodonts from the Early Permian of Germany that were preserved in mud show a scaly epidermis on the belly, and on the underside of the forelimbs and the tail. Given the ichnogenus name Bromackerichnus in 2025, the fossil body impressions are thought to have been made by Dimetrodon teutonis or a closely related "pelycosaur" synapsid, supporting the idea that early synapsids in general had a scaly body covering similar to reptiles. Some synapsid groups later developed bare, glandular skin, eventually with hair and whiskers that became characteristics of mammals.

Unlike a number of known varanopids (such as Archaeovenator and Microvaranops), Ascendonanus does not have dorsal osteoderms on its upper trunk section along the back. However, the middle part of the tail has a covering of small scutes that continues to where the end of the tail is missing in all current specimens. The body outlines preserved show that Ascendonanus had a plump neck and muscular thighs (although the femur bone itself is relatively thin) on its short hindlimbs, while the trunk and the forelimbs are relatively slender.

== Phylogeny ==
Ascendonanus was placed in the Varanopidae, in a basal position as sister species of Apsisaurus by the original authors in 2018. In 2025, Jenkins et al. revised the phylogeny of stem reptiles based on synchrotron data and an expansive phylogenetic dataset. The researchers recognized most identified varanopids as members of the Synapsida but recovered Ascendonanus as a member of the reptile group Neoreptilia, in a clade also containing Cabarzia (also formerly identified as a varanopid) and Orovenator.

== Discovery ==
=== Hilbersdorf scientific excavation ===
All of the current fossils of Ascendonanus were discovered during a test dig by the Chemnitz Museum of Natural History in the Hilbersdorf district of Chemnitz between April 2008 to October 2011. The site was limited to a pit 24 m by 18 m, down to a depth of at least 5 m, and was the first systematic scientific excavation of the Chemnitz fossil forest ever conducted in the city. The museum began a second, more extensive, and ongoing, dig in the Sonnenberg district in 2014. In addition to finding fossils of trees and plants at the Hilbersdorf site, the team recovered remains of vertebrates (synapsids, temnospondyl, aistopods) and arthropods (scorpions, Arthropleura, spiders), some later identified as species new to science.

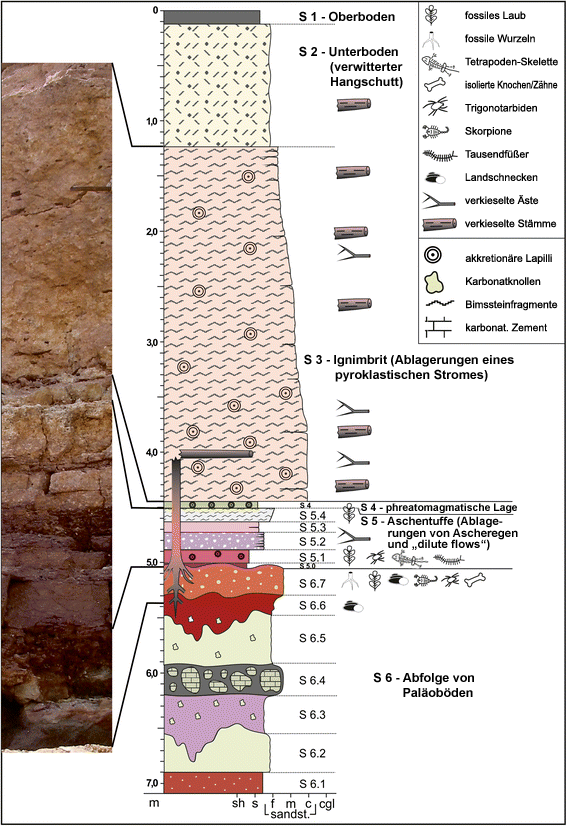
Stratigraphic diagram in German of a fossil site in Chemnitz, showing the successive layers of volcanic ash and debris. All of the Ascendonanus specimens were found in the Level 5 (S 5) fine, wet ash fall layer at the start of eruptions, directly on top of the forest soil layers in the lower third of the sequence. A violent pyroclastic flow then covered the ash layer, making up most of the deposit.

=== Taphonomy ===
During an early phase of the volcanic eruption, rising rhyolitic magma came into contact with groundwater, exploding molten rock into tiny fragments mixed with steam, resulting in falls of wet, relatively cool, fine volcanic ash particles. An initial ash layer covered the ground and knocked leaves off trees, but left the trunks standing.

All of the Acendonanus specimens were found close to the base of upright fossil trees from which the animals evidently had fallen to the ground onto the first ash fall, either after being dislodged by a volcanic blast or, more likely, after being overcome by breathing ash particles or toxic gases, or possibly by lethal temperatures. A second fall of wet ash quickly buried the Ascendonanus individuals and the other animals that were on or under the forest floor up to about 53 cm deep, preventing decay and preserving bodies largely intact (but compacted over time), with detailed impressions or traces of soft tissues. The fossil plant material in the wet ash layer shows no evidence of charring, indicating that the temperature of the ash fall was below 280°C.

Later, more violent phases of the eruption covered the wet ash layer in much deeper deposits of coarser hot pyroclastic material that make up most of the Zeisigwald Tuff Horizon (total depth up to 4 m). The upper trunks and branches of embedded upright trees were snapped off above about 1 m to 3 m from the ground.
