= Anningia =

Scientific classification
- Domain: Eukaryota
- Kingdom: Animalia
- Phylum: Chordata
- Clade: Synapsida
- Family: †Varanopidae
- Subfamily: †Mesenosaurinae
- Genus: †Anningia
- Species: †A. megalops

Binomial name
- †Anningia megalops Broom, 1927

Extinct genus of amniotes

Anningia is an extinct genus in Varanopidae, a family of monitor lizard-like amniotes. It contains a single species, Anningia megalops.

The species was first described by Robert Broom in 1927 as a transitional species between early synapsids and later occurring therapsids. While it was later suggested that the fossil material, a partial poorly preserved skull, was not diagnosable and that the species name is nomen vanum. It was assigned to Varanopidae (subfamily Mesenosaurinae) in 2018. The fossil is from the Permian of South Africa.
