= Thrausmosaurus =

Thrausmosaurus Temporal range: Lower Permian, Kungurian

Scientific classification
- Domain: Eukaryota
- Kingdom: Animalia
- Phylum: Chordata
- Clade: Synapsida
- Family: †Varanopidae
- Genus: †Thrausmosaurus; Fox, 1962

Type species
- †Thrausmosaurus serratidens Fox, 1962

Extinct genus of tetrapods

Thrausmosaurus is a genus of synapsid pelycosaurs from the extinct family Varanopidae. Like all that resemble members of Varanopidae, Thrausmosaurus most likely resembled the modern monitor lizard and may have had the same lifestyle. The type and only species was described by R. C. Fox in 1962, from three fossilized jaw fragments bearing teeth. The specimens were recovered from the fissure-fill deposits uncovered in a Limestone Quarry, north of Fort Sill, Comanche County, Oklahoma, USA. These deposits are dated to the Kungurian (Leonardian) of the Lower Permian.

== Taxonomic history ==
Thrausmosaurus was designated by Fox to belong to the family Sphenacodontidae based on the structure and curvature of the teeth. The genus remained in Sphenacodontidae until the type material was reexamined. In 1986 the type specimen was reassigned to Synapsida incertae sedis by R. R. Reisz, who was unable to identify the relationship of the material to other synapsids. This opinion was reaffirmed by Sullivan and Reisz in 1999. Upon further examination of the specimens, Evans et al. in 2009 reaffirmed the validity of the genus name and placed the genus in the Varanopidae. However they were unable to determine enough distinct characters to maintain the species Thrausmosaurus serratidens, and thus declared the name nomen dubium.

== See also ==
- List of pelycosaurs
