= Hillary Maddin =

Canadian paleontologist and developmental biologist

- Education: University of Toronto; University of Calgary
- Scientific career
- Fields: Palaeobiology; Evolutionary Biology; Developmental Biology
- Workplaces: Carleton University (2013-present); Harvard University (2011-2013); Museum of Comparative Zoology (2011-2013)
- Thesis: Phylogenetic implications of the morphology and development of the braincase of caecilian amphibians (Gymnophiona) (2011)
- Doctoral advisor: Jason Anderson; Anthony Russell
- Website: https://maddinlab.com/

Hillary Catherine Maddin is a Canadian paleontologist and developmental biologist known for her work on development in extinct and extant amphibians. She is currently an associate professor in the Department of Earth Sciences at Carleton University.

== Academic and professional background ==
Maddin obtained her B.Sc. in biology from the University of Toronto (1999-2004). She went on to also complete her M.Sc. degree at the University of Toronto (2004-2006) researching caseid synapsids under the supervision of Robert Reisz, followed by a Ph.D. degree (2006-2011) exploring the morphology and evolution of caecilians at the University of Calgary under the supervision of Anthony Russell and Jason Anderson.

Maddin was awarded the highly competitive NSERC postdoctoral fellowship, which she used to fund a position at the Museum of Comparative Zoology and Harvard University in Cambridge, MA (2011-2013), where she was supervised by Jim Hanken and was subsequently awarded the prestigious Banting Postdoctoral Fellowship, which she used to fund a position at Carleton University in Ottawa, ON (2013-2015), where she was supervised by Claudia Schröder-Adams. Since then, she has held her current position as a faculty member at Carleton.

== Academic contributions ==
Maddin's research encompasses a wide range of topics, primarily related to developmental biology using amphibians as a model system and exploration of morphological and phylogenetic patterns of Paleozoic tetrapods. She has published on a variety of groups, including a variety of synapsids, temnospondyls, and lepospondyls. Much of her research in this area is directed towards anatomy of the braincase and other internal structures, which extends to her work on extant amphibians, primarily examining caecilians. She has also published several studies on the African clawed frog and the axolotl, both a model study system. Her research has been published in leading scientific journals, including Biological Reviews, Nature Communications, and Nature Ecology & Evolution. Maddin has contributed to the naming of several new extinct taxa, outlined below:

Year	Taxon	Authors
2020	Dendromaia unamakiensis gen. et sp. nov.	Maddin, Mann, & Hebert
2020	Martensius bromackerensis gen. et sp. nov.	Berman, Maddin, Henrici, Sumida, Scott, & Reisz
2020	Steenerpeton silvae gen. et sp. nov.	Mann, Gee, Pardo, Marjanović, Adams, Calthorpe, Maddin, & Anderson
2019	Carbonodraco lundi gen. et sp. nov.	Mann & Maddin
2019	Diabloroter bolti gen. et sp. nov.	Mann & Maddin
2019	Infernovenator steenae gen. et sp. nov.	Mann, Pardo, & Maddin
2013	Reiszerpeton renascentis gen. et sp. nov.	Maddin, Fröbisch, Evans, & Milner

Maddin has received numerous federal- or provincial-level grant awards to fund her research, including an Early Researcher Award (ERA) from the Ontario provincial government ($100,000 CAD), a New Frontiers in Research Fund (NFRF) award from the Canadian federal government ($250,000 CAD), and an NSERC Discovery Grant ($40,000 CAD), and her lab's research has been covered by leading news outlets. She also serves as one of three managing editors for the Journal of Vertebrate Paleontology.
