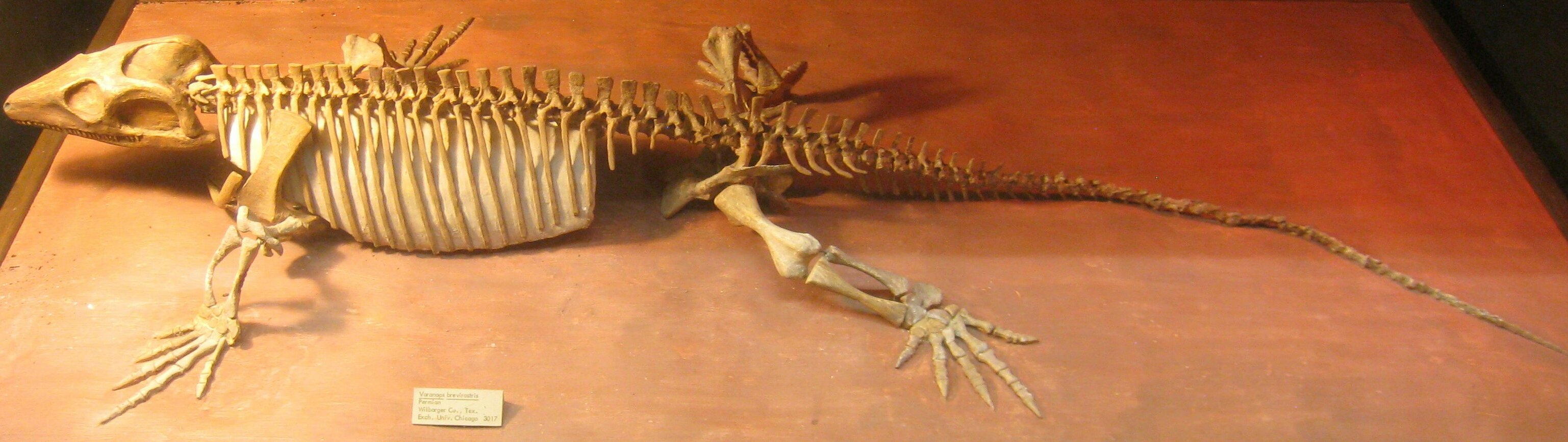
- Fossil skeleton of Varanops brevirostris in the University of Michigan Museum of Natural History

Scientific classification
- Kingdom: Animalia
- Phylum: Chordata
- Clade: Synapsida
- Family: †Varanopidae; Romer and Price, 1940

Genera
- See below

= Varanopidae =

Varanopidae Temporal range: Late Carboniferous - Middle Permian, 309–260 Ma

Extinct family of tetrapods

Varanopidae is an extinct family of amniotes known from the Late Carboniferous to Middle Permian that resembled monitor lizards (with the name of the group deriving from the monitor lizard genus Varanus) and may have filled a similar niche. Typically, they are considered to be relatively basal synapsids (and thus more closely related to mammals than to reptiles), although some studies from the late 2010s recovered them being taxonomically closer to diapsid reptiles; most studies from the early 2020s onwards have supported their traditional placement as synapsids on the basis of high degree of bone labyrinth ossification, maxillary canal morphology, and phylogenetic analyses. However, a consensus regarding their placement within amniotes has yet to be reached.

A varanopid from the late Middle Permian Pristerognathus Assemblage Zone (Capitanian) is the youngest known varanopid and the last member of the "pelycosaur" group of synapsids. Thus, Varanopidae vanishes from the fossil record at the same time as dinocephalians, plausibly as a result of a major mass extinction event that has been called the "Dinocephalian extinction event".

== Description ==
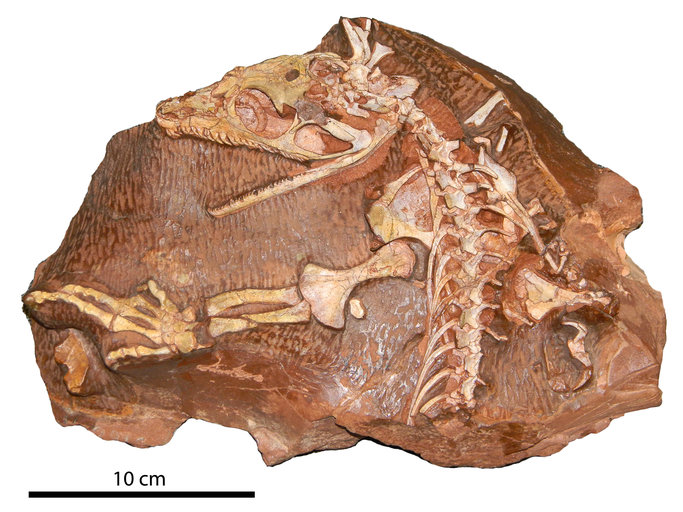
Fossil of Aerosaurus wellesi

No known varanopids developed a sail like Dimetrodon. The length of known varanopids, including the tail, varies from 1 to 2 metres (3 to 7 ft). Varanopids already showed some advanced characteristics of true pelycosaurs such as their deep, narrow, elongated skulls. Their jaws were long and their teeth were sharp. However, they were still primitive by mammalian standards. They had long tails, lizard-like bodies, and thin legs. The varanopids were mostly carnivorous, but as they were reduced in size, their diets changed from a carnivorous to an insectivorous lifestyle. Compared to the other animals in the Early Permian, varanopids were agile creatures.

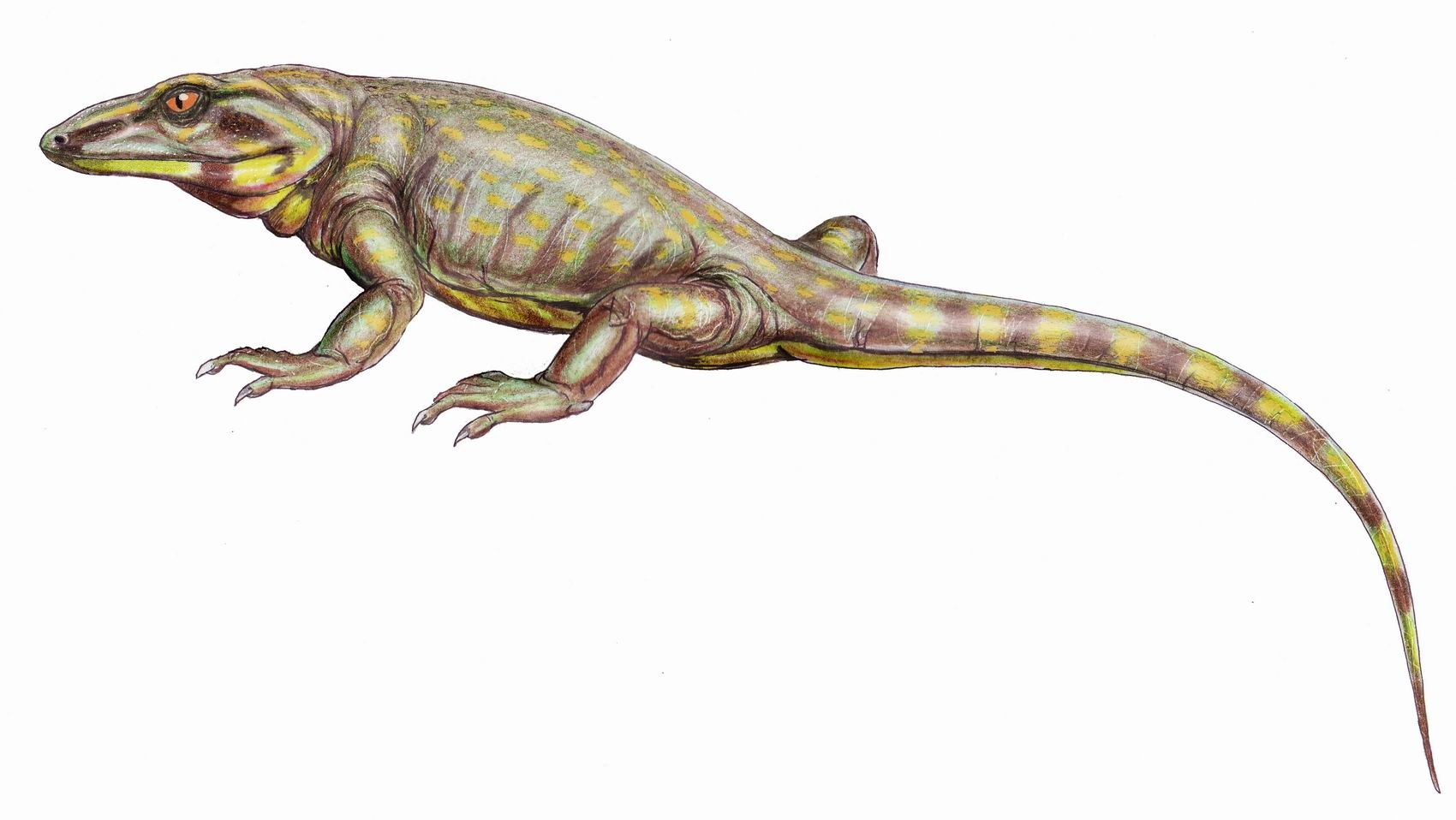
Varanodon agilis

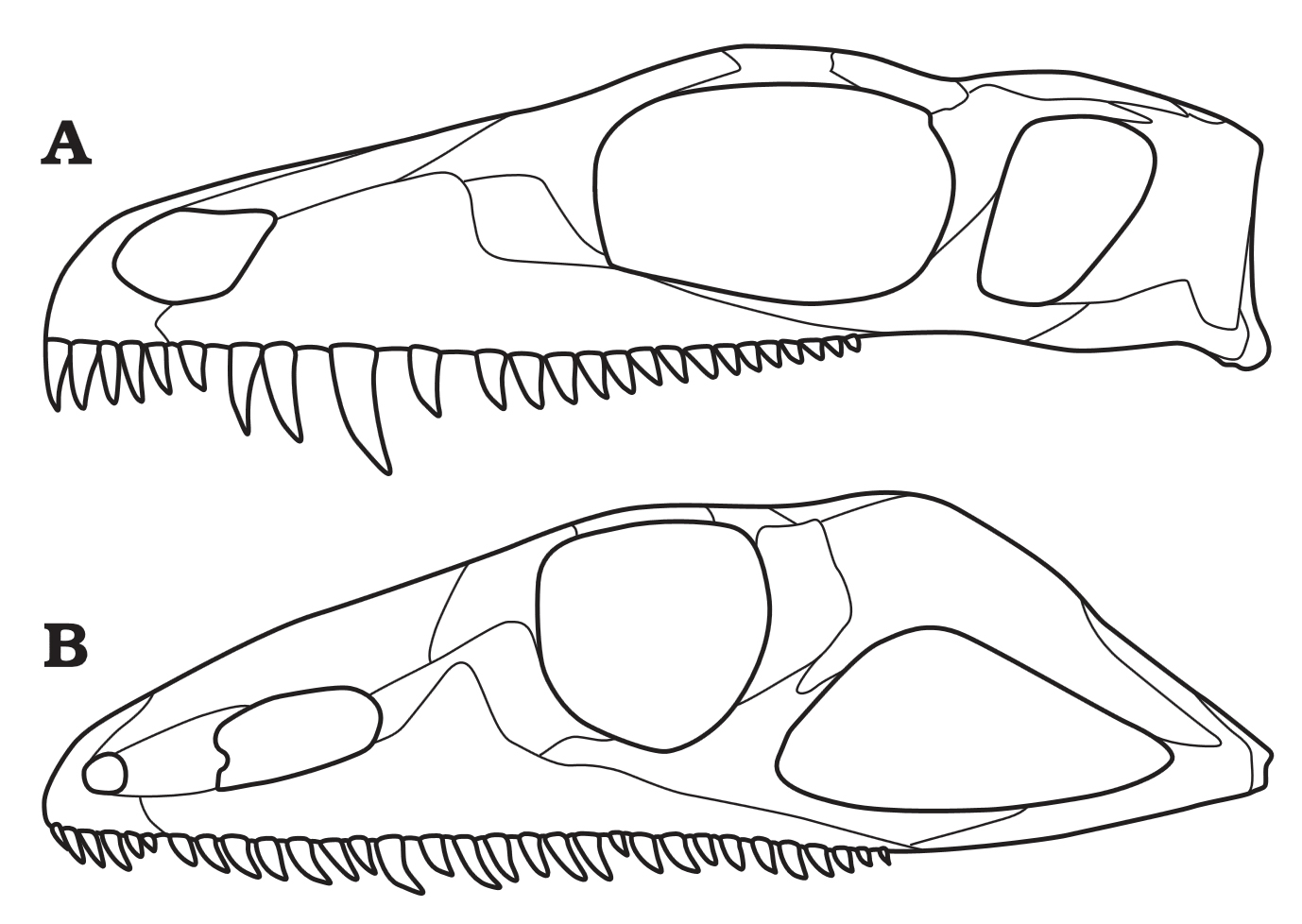
Skulls of Mesenosaurus (top) and Varanodon (bottom), showing variation in skull shape.

A 2025 paper described scaly body impressions left by an Early Permian sphenacodont (likely Dimetrodon teutonis), which would suggest that other early synapsids, including varanopids, likely had scaly skin as well. (Fossils of Ascendonanus, originally classified as a varanopid, also revealed scales akin to those of squamates. However, a study published in 2025 reclassified Ascendonanus along with Cabarzia as neoreptilians, not varanopid synapsids.) Parental care is known in Heleosaurus, suggesting that it is ancestral to synapsids as a whole.

Varanopids are small to medium-sized possible synapsids that have been discovered throughout the supercontinent Pangaea. Varanopids are found in areas of North America, Russia, Europe, and South Africa. The authors Romer and Price (1940) discussed the original positioning of Varanopidae within Synapsida and considered them as the suborder Sphenacodontia. Most phylogenetic analyses have placed Varanopidae as a basal member of Synapsida and due to their positioning, a better understanding of the morphology and phylogeny of varanopids is needed for synapsid evolution. The phylogeny of varanopids is based mostly on cranial morphology. The atlas−axis complex can be described with little effort with variation of this structure within a small clade. Varanopids, members of synapsid predators, have well preserved atlas−axes permitting a description and examination of morphological variation between taxon. The size of the transverse processes on the axis and the shape of the axial neural spine can be variable. For the small mycterosaurine varanopids, they have small transverse processes that point posteroventrally, and the axial spine is dorsoventrally short, with a flattened dorsal margin in lateral view. The larger varanodontine varanopids have large transverse processes with a broad base, and a much taller axial spine with a rounded dorsal margin in lateral view. Using outgroup comparisons, the morphology of the transverse processes is considered a derived trait in varanodontines, while in mycterosaurines the morphology of the axial spine is the derived trait.

== Ecology ==
At least some varanopids such as Eoscansor (and the possible varanopid Ascendonanus) are amongst the oldest known tree climbing (arboreal) animals, with limbs and digits adapted for grasping. Other varanopids lacked these adaptations and were probably terrestrial.

== Classification ==
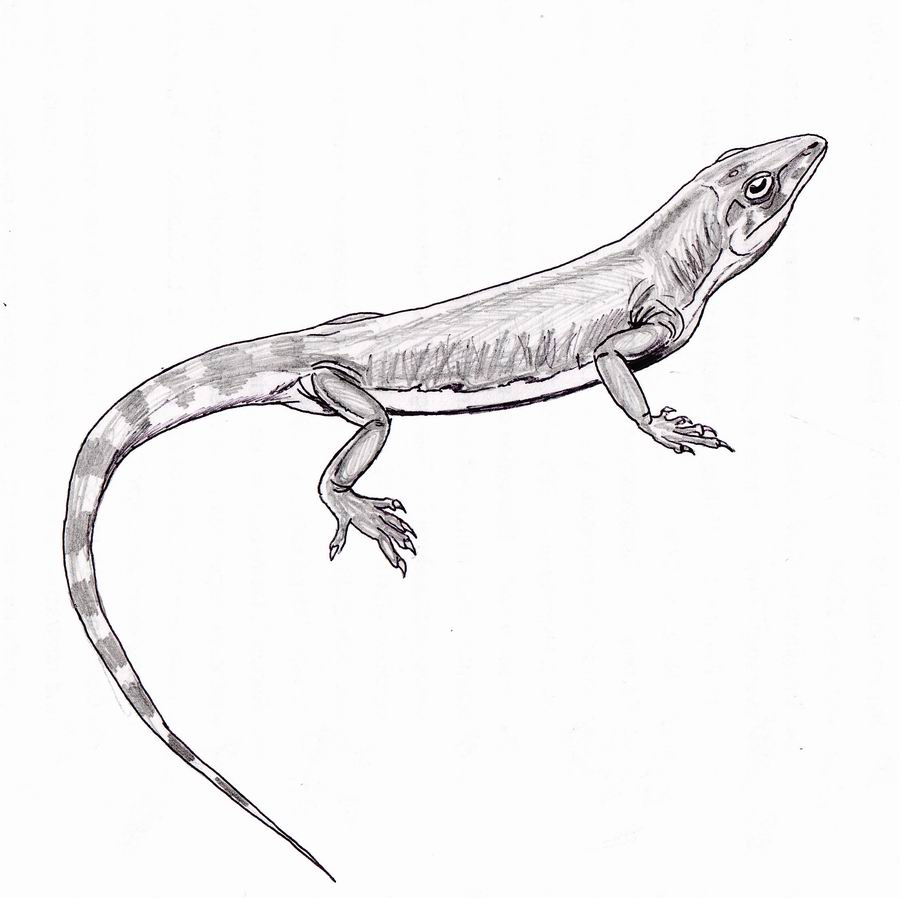
Archaeovenator hamiltonensis

Family Varanopidae

- Apsisaurus
- Archaeovenator
- Ascendonanus (or a non-synapsid neoreptilian)
- Basicranodon (possible junior synonym of Mycterosaurus)
- Eoscansor
- Dendromaia
- Pyozia
- Thrausmosaurus? (nomen dubium)
- Clade Neovaranopsia
  - Subfamily Mesenosaurinae
    - Cabarzia (or a non-synapsid neoreptilian)
    - Mesenosaurus
    - Clade Afrothyra
      - Anningia
      - Elliotsmithia
      - Heleosaurus
      - Microvaranops
  - Subfamily Varanodontinae
    - Aerosaurus
    - Mycterosaurus
    - Ruthiromia
    - Tambacarnifex
    - Varanodon
    - Varanops
    - Watongia

Apsisaurus was formerly assigned as an "eosuchian" diapsid. In 2010, it was redescribed by Robert R. Reisz, Michel Laurin, and David Marjanović; their phylogenetic analysis found it to be a basal varanopid synapsid. The poorly known Basicranodon and Ruthiromia were tentatively assigned to Varanopidae by Reisz (1986), but have been neglected in more recent studies. They were included for the first time in a phylogenetic analysis by Benson (2012). Ruthiromia was found to be most closely related to Aerosaurus. Basicranodon was found to be a wildcard taxon due to its small amount of known materials, as it is based on a partial braincase from the ?Kungurian stage Richards Spur locality in Oklahoma. It occupies two possible positions, falling either as a mycterosaurine, or as the sister taxon of Pyozia. Although Reisz et al. (1997) considered Basicranodon as a subjective junior synonym of Mycterosaurus, Benson (2012) found some differences in the distribution of teeth and shape of the dentigerous ventral platform medial to the basipterygoid processes that may indicate taxonomic distinction.

In 2025, Michel Laurin and Gilles Didier published a review of the evolution of varanopids, including an updated phylogenetic analysis of most known species. Taxa that had not been added to previous iterations of their phylogenetic matrix were included under topological constraints. They acknowledged the possibility of a polyphyletic Varanopidae, with Ascendonanus and Cabarzia as non-varanopid sauropsids (more closely related to reptiles than mammals), as well as the potential synonymy of all South African varanopids under the species Heleosaurus scholtzi. These results are displayed in the cladogram below, with debated taxa highlighted:

- Varanopidae
  - - Eoscansor cobrensis
    - - Apsisaurus witteri
      - Ascendonanus nestleri
  - - - Archaeovenator hamiltonensis
      - Dendromaia unamakiensis
      - Pyozia mesenensis
    - - Mesenosaurinae
        - Cabarzia trostheidei
        - - Mesenosaurus efremovi
          - Mesenosaurus romeri
      - - Afrothyra (or Heleosaurus scholtzi)
          - Elliotsmithia longiceps
          - Heleosaurus scholtzi
          - - Anningia megalops
            - Microvaranops parentis
        - - Mycterosaurus longiceps
          - Varanodontinae
            - - Varanops brevirostris
              - - Varanodon agilis
                - Watongia meieri
            - - Tambacarnifex unguifalcatus
              - - Ruthiromia elcobriensis
                - - Aerosaurus greenleeorum
                  - Aerosaurus wellesi

possible non-varanopid sauropsids
possible synonyms of Heleosaurus scholtzi
