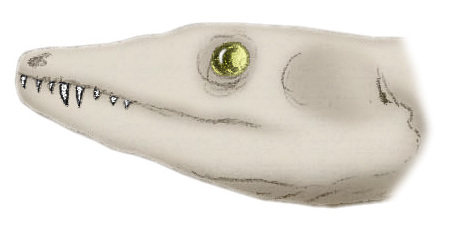

Scientific classification
- Domain: Eukaryota
- Kingdom: Animalia
- Phylum: Chordata
- Clade: Synapsida
- Family: †Varanopidae
- Genus: †Apsisaurus; Laurin, 1991
- Species: †A. witteri

Binomial name
- †Apsisaurus witteri Laurin, 1991

= Apsisaurus =

Apsisaurus Temporal range: Early Permian 298.9–286 Ma

Extinct genus of tetrapods

Apsisaurus is an extinct genus of Early Permian varanopid synapsids known from Texas of the United States. It was first named by Michel Laurin in 1991 and the type species is Apsisaurus witteri. Apsisaurus witteri is known from the holotype MCZ 1474, a three-dimensionally preserved partial skeleton including an incomplete skull and mandibles. The skull roof of Archeria is also articulated to the postcranial skeleton. It was collected in the Archer City Bonebed 1 site, from the Archer City Formation of the Wichita Group, dating to the Early Permian epoch. Apsisaurus was formerly assigned as an "eosuchian" diapsid. In 2010, it was redescribed by Robert R. Reisz, Michel Laurin and David Marjanović; their phylogenetic analysis found it to be a basal varanopid synapsid.

Below is a simplified version of the cladogram found by Reisz, Laurin and Marjanović, 2010.

- Varanopidae
  - Archaeovenator
  - - Apsisaurus
    - - Mesenosaurus
      - Mycterosaurus
      - Varanopinae
