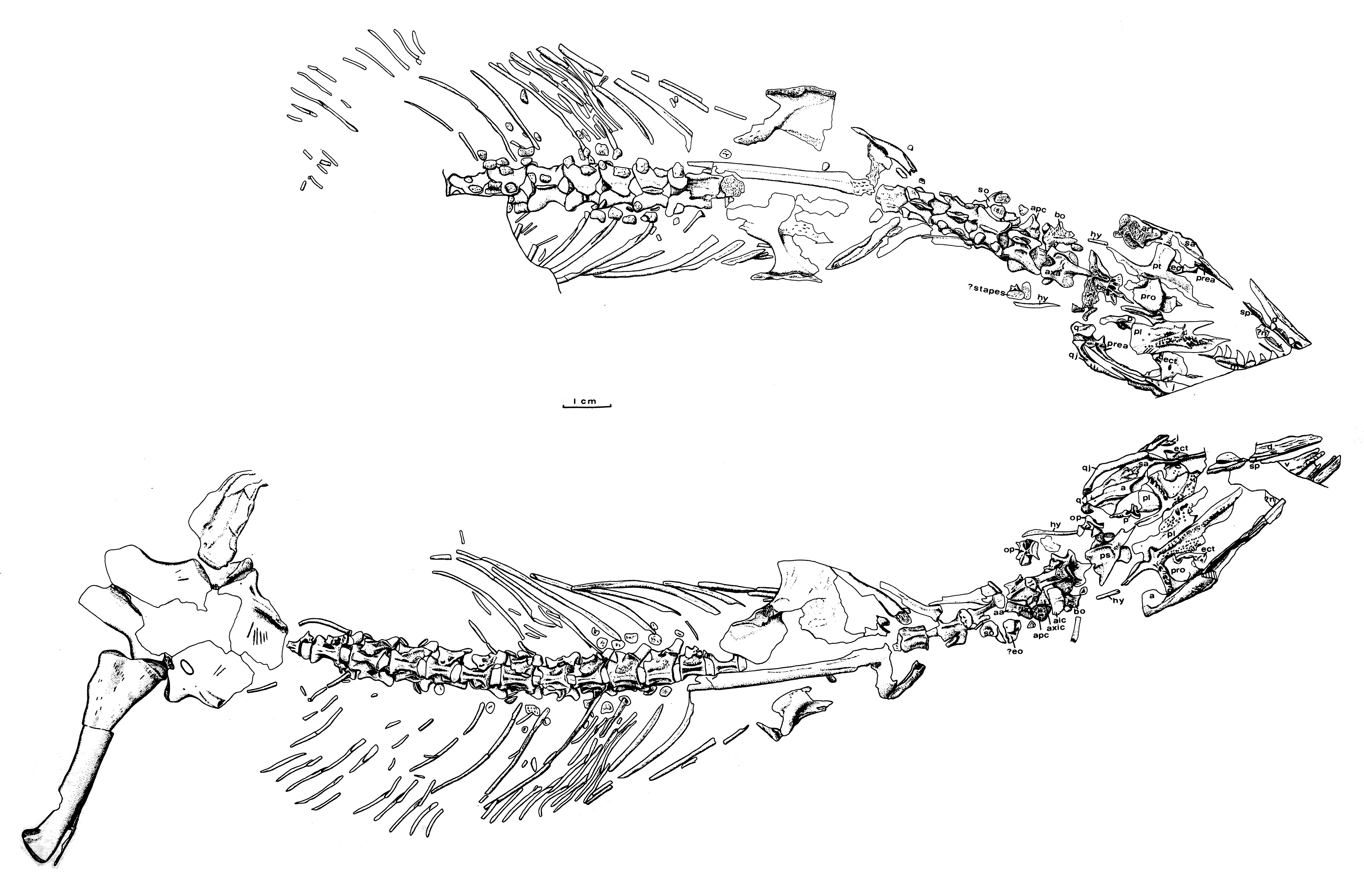
- Drawing of the holotype specimen of Heleosaurus scholtzi (from Carroll, 1976)

Scientific classification
- Domain: Eukaryota
- Kingdom: Animalia
- Phylum: Chordata
- Clade: Synapsida
- Family: †Varanopidae
- Subfamily: †Mycterosaurinae
- Genus: †Heleosaurus; Broom, 1907

Type species
- †Heleosaurus scholtzi Broom, 1907

= Heleosaurus =

Heleosaurus Temporal range: Early-Middle Permian, 290–270 Ma

Extinct genus of tetrapods

Heleosaurus scholtzi is an extinct species of basal synapsids, known as pelycosaurs, in the family of Varanopidae during the middle Permian. At first H. scholtzi was mistakenly classified as a diapsid. Members of this family were carnivorous and had dermal armor, and somewhat resembled monitor lizards. This family was the most geologically long lived, widespread, and diverse group of early amniotes. To date only two fossils have been found in the rocks of South Africa. One of these fossils is an aggregation of five individuals.

H. scholtzi was first described by Broom in 1907 who originally placed it as an early diapsid. It is named for his student, T.J.R. Scholtz, and was originally called Galechirus scholtzi. Later work placed it as an Eosuchian in the family Younginidae and even proposed as an ancestor for Archosauria. More recent work has placed it where it is now within Mycterosaurinae in the family Varanopidae. The closely related Elliotsmithia longiceps has been placed in a sister taxon to H. scholtzi.

== Description and paleobiology ==
=== General ===
Basal varanopids are small, slender animals specialized for a specific feeding niche. H. scholtzi have six main features that are Varanopid autapomorphies, placing them firmly in the family. These are their slender, elongated quadratojugals; anterodorsal sloping of the quadrate; parasphenoid dentition; elongate hyoids; plate-like interclavicle heads; and their recurved and serrated teeth with a labiolingual compression. They also have three main autapomorphies unique to the species; these are the trunk osteoderms, ornamentation on the surangular and angular, and a longitudinal median groove ventrally placed on the dorsal centra surface.

=== Known fossil specimens ===
The holotype fossil, SAM-PK-1070, is preserved in negative relief and has a partial skull, mandibles, axial skeleton, pectoral and pelvic girdles, osteoderms, and femur elements. The preserved femurs include a complete left and partial right. Partial skull elements present are the maxilla, quadrate, parabasisphenol, jugal, quadratojugal, mandible, and the palate. Little of the skull roof remains in this specimen. The alveolar region of the mandible has five teeth preserved in it.

The aggregate fossil composed of five individuals is better preserved and showed several new features not present in the holotype. These include a contact between the maxilla and both the prefrontal and the quadratojugals. An anterior inclination of the occiput and the exclusion of the quadratojugal from the temporal fenestra are also clear in this specimen. However, Spindler et al. (2018) transferred this aggregation to the separate species Microvaranops parentis.

=== Skull morphology ===
Many aspects of the skull structure are apparent between the two fossils. The overall shape is triangular and narrow, typical of Varanopids. H. scholtzi’s snout is made up of the premaxilla bone. A long narrow rectangular process of the naris along the antorbital region forms a straight dorsal border with the external naris. Where the premaxilla meets with the naris there is a straight suture instead of the Varanopid typical V-shaped one. The jugal and quadratojugal have pinched tubercular ornamentation on the lateral sides. The quadratojugal has the elongated and slender shape distinct to the Varanopids, as well as a slender groove on the dorsal edge. This serves as an attachment for the squamosal, which extends anteriorly under the lateral temporal fenestra. The right jugal is almost completely preserved with clear postorbital and subtemporal rami and a large tubercle near the ventral edge. The vomers are long and slender with marginal teeth present on the medial edge of the right vomer. H. scholtzi has ventrally preserved palantines that have extending diagonally across. Near the posterior edge of the internal naris they bifurcate. Suborbital fenestrae could not have been supported by the palantines due to their width. Presence of this kind of fenestrae are seen in diapsids but absent in basal synapsids. The parabasisphenoid has a cultriform process, the extended process at the anterior end of the braincase, that is transversely broad with a deep parabolic groove between cristae ventrolaterals. These are ridges formed by the lateral edges of the bones. Posteriorly paired depressions of the parabasisphenoid were likely for cervical muscle attachments. Small alveoli for teeth are also present on a continuous plate ventrally on the cultriform process. Reisz (2007) describe a posterior coronoid, which was originally described as the prearticular by Carroll (1976). An anterior coronoid is also described by Reisz which was originally described as the splenial by Broom (1907). The angular and surangular ornamentation are prolate and pustolous shaped tubercles [R]. Typical of Varanopids the ceratohyal is elongated and slender, acting like a strut that extends past the posterior end of the skull. H. scholtzi’s parietals are broad, triangular, and take up most of the post-orbital region. The corners form a wing-like concave process postlaterally. The pineal foramen is large, oval in shape, and slightly sunken into the parietals. Teeth of H. scholtzi are typical of Varanopids with a recurved shape, serrated mesially and distally on some. A slightly larger caniniform is present a third of the way in from the anterior end of the maxilla. These teeth are very similar to those of Mycterosaurus, but a little more robust.

=== Postcranial skeleton ===
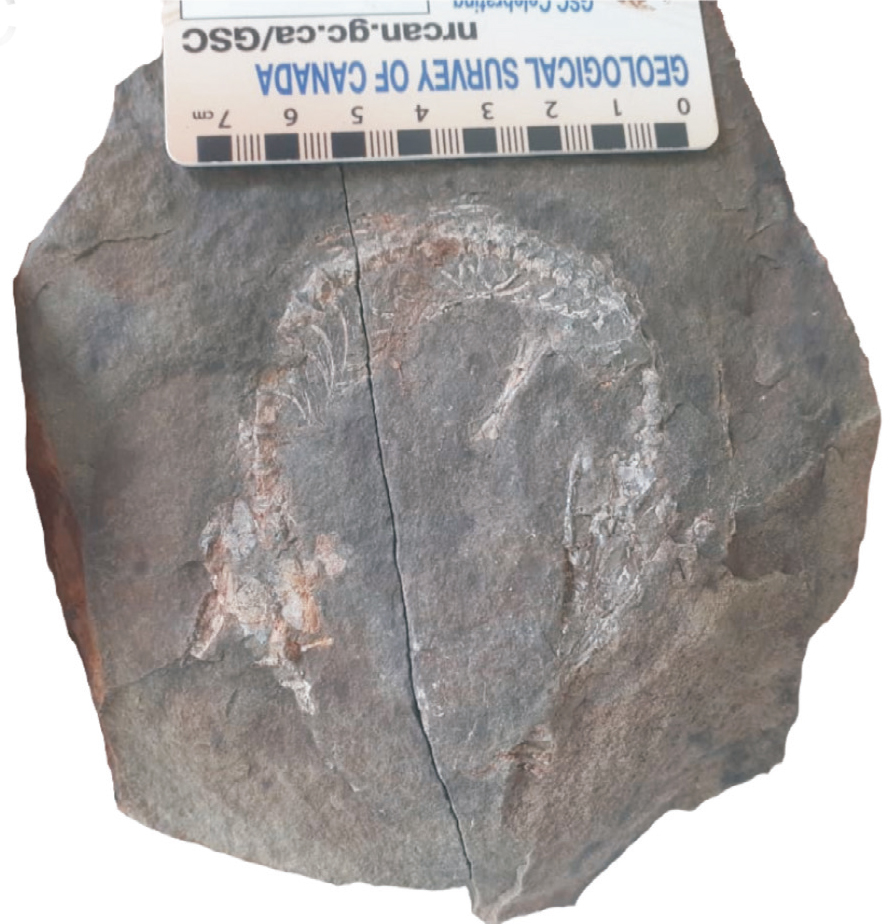
Possible specimen

Vertebrae of H. scholtzi have neural arches that are slightly longer anteroposteriorly than they are wide, a feature also seen in Mycterosaurus. Neural spines have a blade like structure that are relatively narrow dorsally. Most Varanopids have shallow grooves on the lateral surfaces of their vertebrae, but this is only seen in the cervical region of H. scholtzi. This feature is also seen in Mesenosaurus. The cervical vertebrae have a median ventral keel that is well developed. Dorsal vertebrae have a broad ridge running along the midline of the centrum, subdivided by a shallow groove. This feature is unique and very uncommon in basal amniotes. Articulation of the vertebrae can be seen in some of the individuals in the aggregate fossil, SAM-PK-K8305. This includes the caudal region of the vertebral column. Slender ribs attached have holocephalous heads joined by a web of bones. The proximal ends are slender while the heads are triangular in shape. Very slender gastralia are present in the aggregate fossil.

Surrounding the ventral column are a series of osteoderms, small rounded ossicles. These are a key autapomorphy of H. scholtzi and are articulated in the aggregate fossil. They form transverse rows of up to five osteoderms, with two to three rows per vertebrae. This feature is shared by Elliotsmithia, another Permian synapsid.

Preservation of the scapulacoracoids is good and show an autapomorphy for Varanopids, lack of a supraglenoid. The scapular blade of H. scholtzi is low and broad. Clavicles are preserved in both fossils and are long slender rods with narrow heads. These are positioned posterodorsally with the posterior edges tapering to connect with the scapulacoracoids. The interclavicle head has a plate like shape with a long shaft, estimated by Reisz to be around the same length of six centra.

The humerus is slender with narrow ends, well preserved in one individual of the aggregate fossil. An ectepicondylar foramen is formed from the supinator process and ectiepicondyle. Radii and ulna are preserved in the aggregate and are about equal in length, about 83% of the humerus length. The radius is almost straight and the ulna slightly more robust. Two of the juvenile individuals of the aggregate have radii with a slightly bowed shape. The metacarpals and phalanges of H. scholtzi have a long and slender shape to them.

Pelvic girdles are preserved in both fossils and shows the anteroposteriorly elongated ischium typical of synapsids as well as a blade like distal shape and a well-developed pubic foramen. The ilium is also elongated and rises anteriorly above the acetabulum. At the anterodorsal margin of the acetabulum the ilium and pubis connect posteriorly to form it. The pubis does not fuse to the ilium but instead twists to lay 90 degrees to the iliac blade.

Femurs are preserved in both fossils and are slender, elongated bones with a sigmoidal curve. The proximal end turns up while the distal end curves down, forming the curved shape. Shaft diameter of the femur is 10% of the total length and has a trochanter widely separated from the head. Overall the femur is almost identical to that of Mycterosaurus.

== Palaeoenvironment ==
The exact locale of the holotype is uncertain due to Broom's inexact description, but work by Reisz and Modesto (2007) places it in the Tapinocephalus Assemblage Zone exposures in Victoria West. This makes the horizon the Abrahamskraal formation, Beaufort Group, in the Karoo Basin. The discovery of the second fossil in that locale confirmed this as the horizon.

== See also ==
- List of pelycosaurs
- Varanopidae
- Mycterosaurus
- Mesenosaurus
- Elliotsmithia
