= Eoscansor =

Eoscansor Temporal range: Late Carboniferous, 305 Ma

Scientific classification
- Kingdom: Animalia
- Phylum: Chordata
- Clade: Synapsida
- Family: †Varanopidae
- Genus: †Eoscansor; Lucas et al., 2022
- Species: †E. cobrensis

Binomial name
- †Eoscansor cobrensis Lucas et al., 2022

Genus of varanopids

Eoscansor (EE-oh-SKAN-sor; meaning "dawn climber") is a species of small varanopid amniote that lived during the upper Pennsylvanian subperiod in northern New Mexico, United States 305 million years ago. The species Eoscansor cobrensis was 24.5 centimeters (9.6 inches) long and weighed 58.3 grams. The tetrapods teeth indicated that it was insectivorous. The small size and grasping limbs means that was E. cobrensis highly agile and likely arboreal (tree climbing). The name Eoscansor means "dawn climber", derived from Greek "Eos" meaning dawn and Latin "scansor" meaning climber. E. cobrensis is currently the oldest specialised climbing tetrapod animal pushing back the original record by 15 million years. The species was discovered in the El Cobre Canyon Formation in northern New Mexico near the village of Chama in 2005 but was not prepared until 2015. The COVID-19 pandemic in 2020 pushed study back until 2022 where it was described as a new genus and species. Eoscansor fossil holotype (NMMHS P-75122) is part of the New Mexico Museum of Natural History and Science (NMMNHS) collection.

The holotype specimen of E. cobrensis is incomplete. Preserved skeletal remains consist of some skull fragments, an incomplete dentary with several teeth, atlas, axis. The fossil includes two anterior vertebrae and at least ten dorsal vertebrae, eight caudal vertebrae, incomplete interclavicle, parts of both clavicles, rib bones and gastralia, humeri, right raidus, ulnae, partial left and right manus and left ilium. The skeleton also includes a ischium, pubis, femora (~22mm), tibiae, fibulae and both left and right incomplete pedes.
