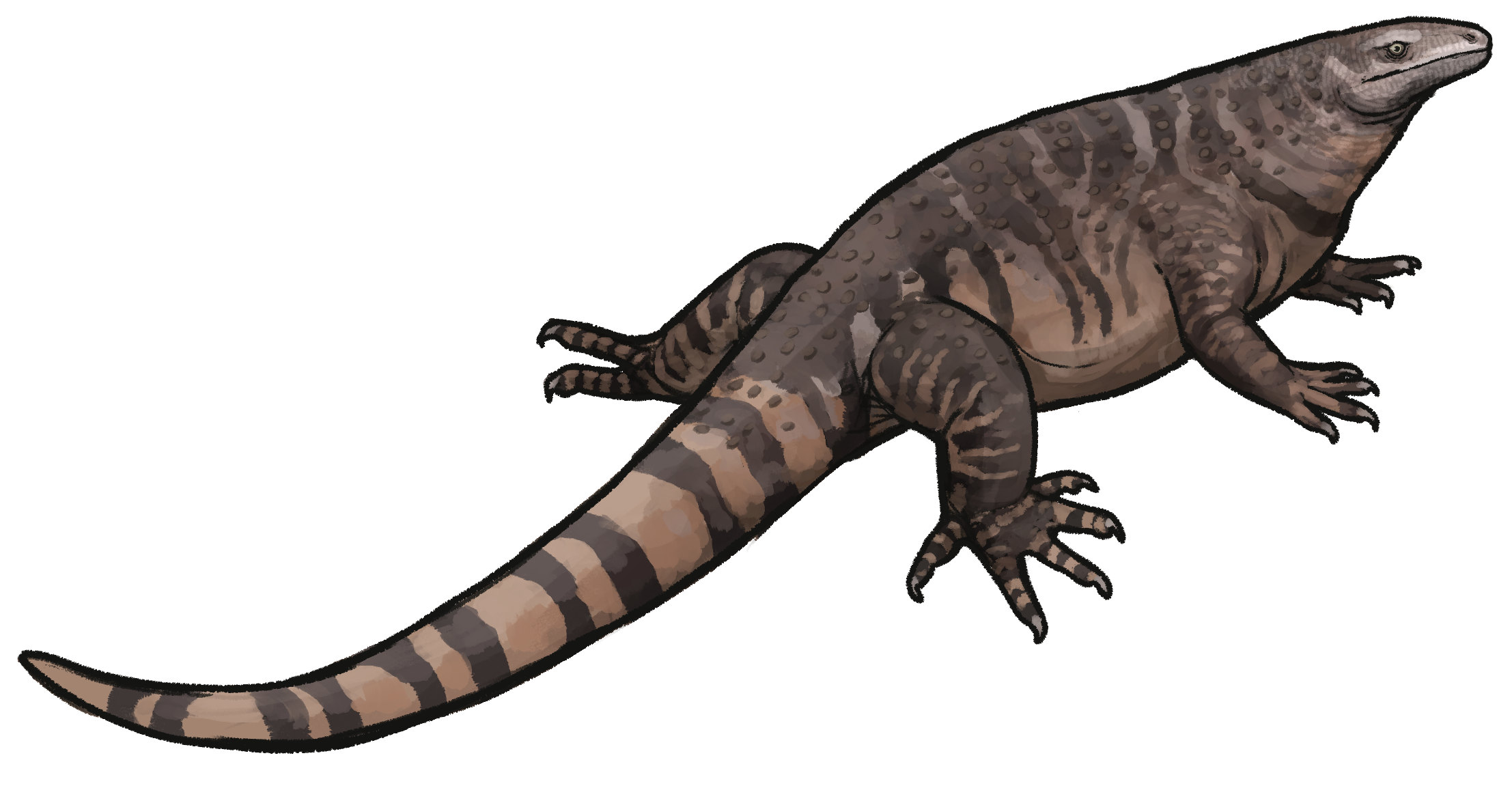
- Speculative life reconstruction

Scientific classification
- Domain: Eukaryota
- Kingdom: Animalia
- Phylum: Chordata
- Clade: Synapsida
- Family: †Varanopidae
- Subfamily: †Varanopinae
- Genus: †Elliotsmithia; Broom, 1937

Type species
- †Elliotsmithia longiceps Broom, 1937

= Elliotsmithia =

Elliotsmithia Temporal range: Middle Permian

Extinct genus of tetrapods

Elliotsmithia is a small varanopid synapsid found from the late Middle Permian of South Africa. It is the sole basal synapsid "pelycosaur" known from the supercontinent Gondwana and only two specimens have been yielded to date. Its species name longiceps is derived from Latin, meaning "long head". Both known Elliotsmithia fossils were recovered from Abrahamskraal Formation rocks—within the boundaries of the Tapinocephalus Assemblage Zone—of the lower Beaufort Group. It was named for the late Sir Grafton Elliot Smith in 1937.

== History of discovery ==
In 1917 Dr. Van Hoepen discovered the fossil holotype of Elliotsmithia. The holotype consisted of a skull, mandibles with most of the front region missing, the first four cervical vertebrae complete with atlas-axis complex, rib fragments, and dermal ossifications. Van Hoepen found the fossil in rocks associated with the Tapinocephalus Assemblage Zone near the town Prince Albert in the Western Cape. The specimen remained undescribed until renowned paleontologist and physician, Dr. Robert Broom, briefly described and named the fossil in 1937. However, Broom did not go into great detail in his description. Several researchers authored papers over several decades, providing passing descriptions of the fossil. In the 1990s, renewed research on the holotype fossil classified Elliotsmithia as a varanopseid "pelycosaur" synapsid. Another specimen was found in 2001.

A possible third specimen was recovered from the Pristerognathus Assemblage Zone in 2010; however, this specimen requires further research.

== Description ==
Elliotsmithia is considered to have been a small carnivore that hunted insects and small vertebrates. It had a long, slender snout complete with recurved, mediolaterally flattened serrated teeth for hooking its prey.

== Stratigraphic range ==
Both known Elliotsmithia fossils were recovered from rock deposits of the Middle Permian Tapinocephalus Assemblage Zone, Abrahamskraal Formation of the Beaufort Group. Another possible specimen of Elliotsmithia was recovered from the lower Teekloof Formation of the latest Middle Permian-aged Pristerognathus Assemblage Zone. Elliotsmithia is an extremely important fossil species as it provides proof of the cosmopolitan range of basal varanopseid synapsids, especially within Gondwana where therapsids were the dominant fauna.

== Classification ==
It is currently accepted that Elliotsmithia is a basal varanopid eupelycosaur synapsid and part of the informal "pelycosaur" group. Recent paleobiology analyses of its cranial bones confidently places this basal synapsid as a sister taxon to the varanopid clade composed of Varanops, Aerosaurus, and Varanodon from North America.

Little research has been endeavored on the fossils of Elliotsmithia and this species warrants further study.

== See also ==
- List of pelycosaurs
