= Pyozia =

Pyozia Temporal range: Capitanian, 264.28–263 Ma

Scientific classification
- Domain: Eukaryota
- Kingdom: Animalia
- Phylum: Chordata
- Clade: Synapsida
- Family: †Varanopidae
- Genus: †Pyozia; Anderson & Reisz, 2004
- Species: †P. mesenensis

Binomial name
- †Pyozia mesenensis Anderson & Reisz, 2004

Extinct genus of tetrapods

Pyozia is an extinct genus of basal Middle Permian varanopid synapsids known from Russia. It was first named by Jason S. Anderson and Robert R. Reisz in 2004 and the type species is Pyozia mesenensis. Pyozia mesenensis is known from the holotype PIN 3717/33, a three-dimensionally preserved partial skeleton including a nearly complete skull. It was collected from the Krasnoschelsk Formation, dating to the Capitanian stage of the Guadalupian epoch, about 264.28-263 million years ago.

The cladogram below is modified after Anderson and Reisz, 2004.

- Varanopidae
  - Archaeovenator
  - - Pyozia
    - - Mycterosaurinae
      - Varanodontinae
