= Microvaranops =

Microvaranops Temporal range: Late Permian, Capitanian

Scientific classification
- Domain: Eukaryota
- Kingdom: Animalia
- Phylum: Chordata
- Clade: Synapsida
- Family: †Varanopidae
- Genus: †Microvaranops; Spindler et al., 2018

Type species
- †Microvaranops parentis Spindler et al., 2018

Extinct genus of tetrapods

Microvaranops is a Middle Permian synapsid of the family Varanopidae from the Abrahamskraal Formation of South Africa. It includes one species, Microvaranops parentis, which was probably arboreal. A slab containing five specimens of Microvaranops indicates that it gathered or lived in groups.
