= Ruthiromia =

Ruthiromia Temporal range: Early Permian

Scientific classification
- Domain: Eukaryota
- Kingdom: Animalia
- Phylum: Chordata
- Clade: Synapsida
- Family: †Varanopidae
- Subfamily: †Varanopinae
- Genus: †Ruthiromia; Eberth & Brinkman, 1983

Type species
- †Ruthiromia elcobriensis Eberth & Brinkman, 1983

Extinct genus of tetrapods

Ruthiromia is an extinct genus of varanopid synapsids from the Early Permian of the United States.

== See also ==
- List of pelycosaurs
