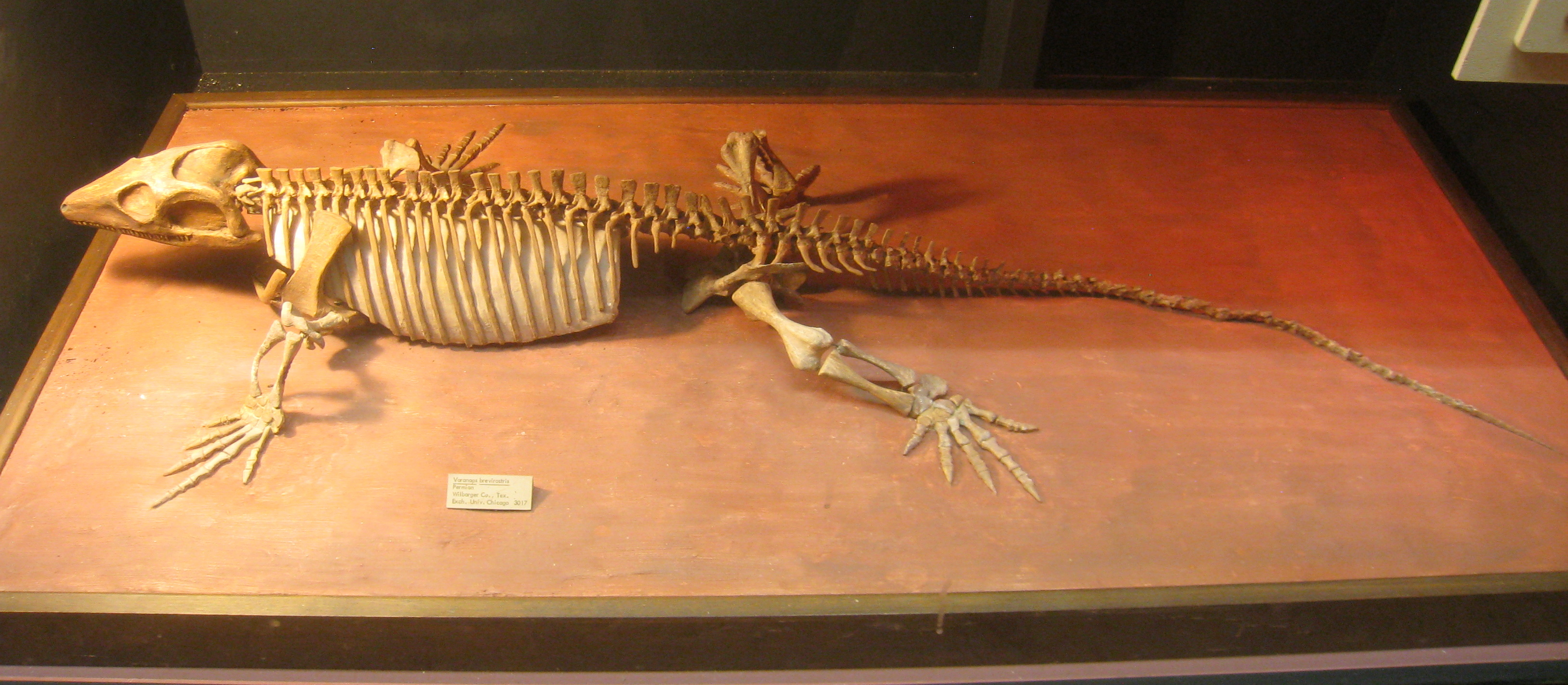
- Reconstructed skeleton
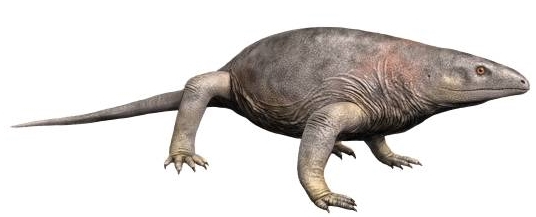
- Reconstruction of Varanops

Scientific classification
- Kingdom: Animalia
- Phylum: Chordata
- Clade: Synapsida
- Family: †Varanopidae
- Subfamily: †Varanopinae
- Genus: †Varanops; Williston, 1914
- Species: †V. brevirostris

Binomial name
- †Varanops brevirostris (Williston, 1911 [originally Varanosaurus])

= Varanops =

Varanops Temporal range: Early Permian, 279.5–272.5 Ma

Extinct genus of tetrapods

Varanops (meaning "monitor lizard face") is an extinct genus of Early Permian varanopid known from Texas and Oklahoma of the United States. It was first named by Samuel Wendell Williston in 1911 as a second species of Varanosaurus, Varanosaurus brevirostris. In 1914, Samuel W. Williston reassigned it to its own genus and the type species is Varanops brevirostris.

== Discovery ==
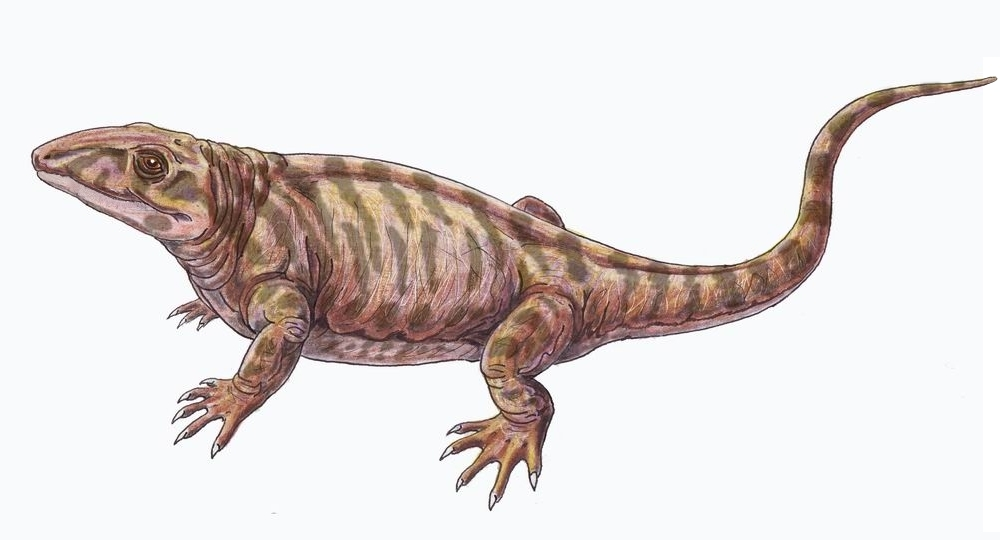
Restoration of V. brevirostris

V. brevirostris is known from the holotype FMNH UC 644, a three-dimensionally preserved nearly complete and articulated skeleton including a nearly complete skull and mandibles. It was collected in the Indian Creek, 35 site (=Cacops Bonebed), from the Arroyo Formation of the Clear Fork Group, Baylor County of Texas, dating to the early Kungurian stage of the Cisuralian Epoch, about 279.5 to 272.5 million years ago. Many well-preserved specimens from the same locality and horizon of the type specimen, including FMNH UR 2423, nearly complete skull and mandibles, MCZ 1926, complete skull and mandibles and FMNH P 12841, partial skeleton, are referred to V. brevirostris. One articulated skeleton with bite marks was found in southwest of Abilene (Arroyo Formation), Taylor County of Texas. Specimens (OMNH 73156-73178) of V. brevirostris were also collected in the Richards Spur, from the Garber Formation (Dolese Brothers Limestone Quarry) of the Sumner Group, Comanche County of Oklahoma, dating to the same age. Those remains came from at least three individuals, and represents the first varanodontine material from the Richards Spur. Finally, TMM 43628-1, a partial skeleton with nearly complete skull, was collected in the Mud Hill locality, from the Vale Formation of the Clear Fork Group, Taylor County, also dating to the same age.

== Description ==
Varanops was a large amniote, around the size of the modern monitor lizards. It was about 1.2 m (3.9 ft) long, and had large limbs and sharp, backward-curving teeth. It was one of many agile, voracious predators among Permian tetrapods. Even though it was large for its time, Varanops was very small compared to the dinosaurs that came much later.

== Classification ==
Varanops is the type genus of the family Varanopidae. Cladistic analysis performed by Nicolás E. Campione and Robert R. Reisz in 2010 suggests that Varanops is a derived varanodontine, sister taxon to the clade formed by Varanodon and Watongia.
