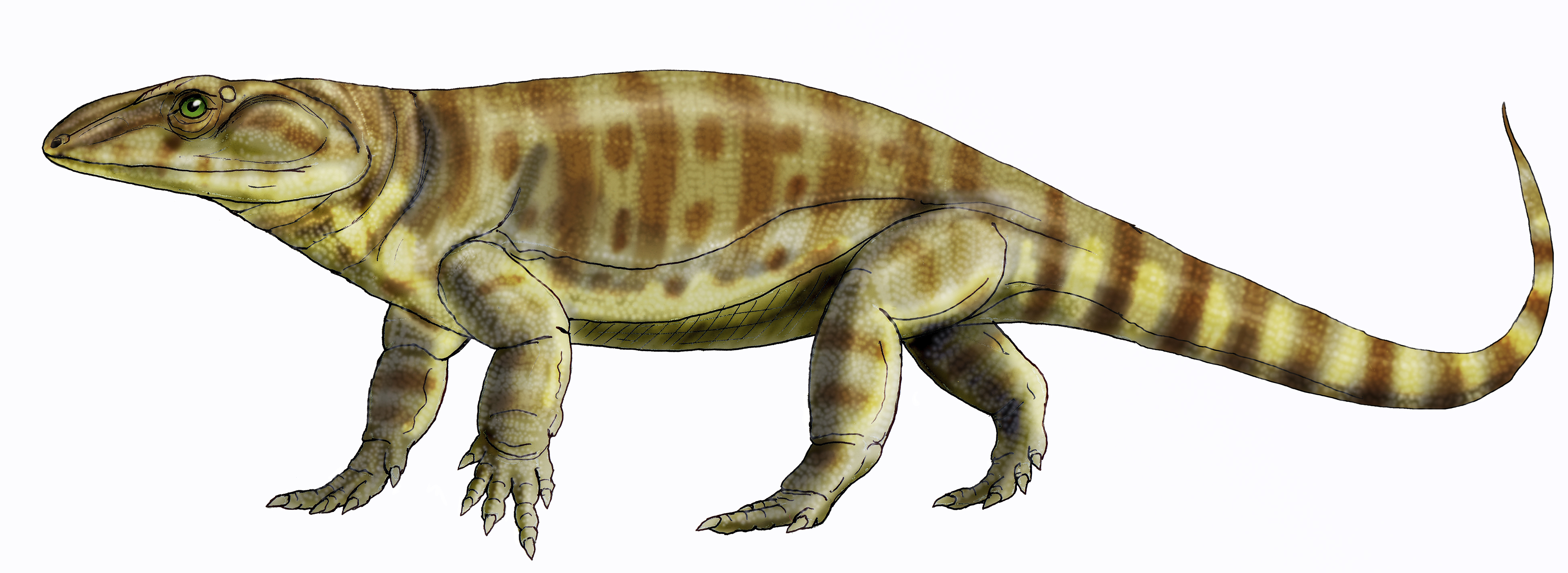
- Restoration

Scientific classification
- Domain: Eukaryota
- Kingdom: Animalia
- Phylum: Chordata
- Clade: Synapsida
- Family: †Varanopidae
- Subfamily: †Varanopinae
- Genus: †Watongia; Olson, 1974

Type species
- †Watongia meieri Olson, 1974

= Watongia =

Watongia Temporal range: Middle Permian

Extinct genus of synapsids

Watongia is an extinct genus of non-mammalian synapsids from Middle Permian of Oklahoma. Only one species has been described, Watongia meieri, from the Chickasha Formation. It was assigned to family Gorgonopsidae by Olson and to Eotitanosuchia by Carroll. Reisz and collaborators assigned the genus in Varanopidae. Based on comparisons of its vertebrae with other varanopids, it was the largest varanopid with a body length of approximately 2 metres (6 ft 7 in). It was a contemporary of its closest relative, the much smaller Varanodon; the two may possibly represent growth stages of a single animal.

== See also ==
- List of pelycosaurs
