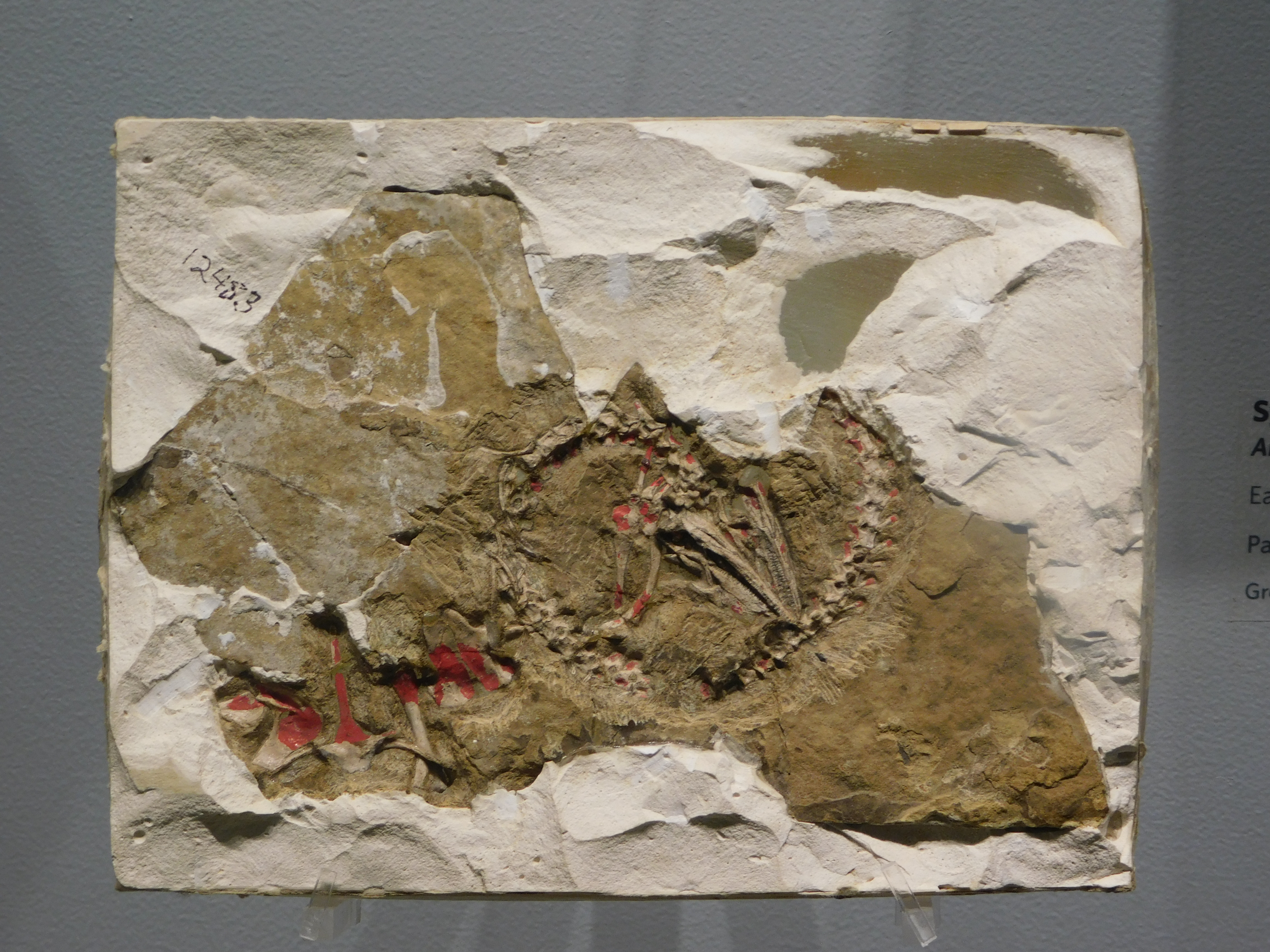
- Holotype skeleton

Scientific classification
- Kingdom: Animalia
- Phylum: Chordata
- Clade: Synapsida
- Family: †Varanopidae
- Genus: †Archaeovenator; Reisz & Dilkes, 2003
- Species: †A. hamiltonensis

Binomial name
- †Archaeovenator hamiltonensis Reisz & Dilkes, 2003

= Archaeovenator =

Archaeovenator Temporal range: Late Carboniferous, 300 Ma

Extinct genus of tetrapods

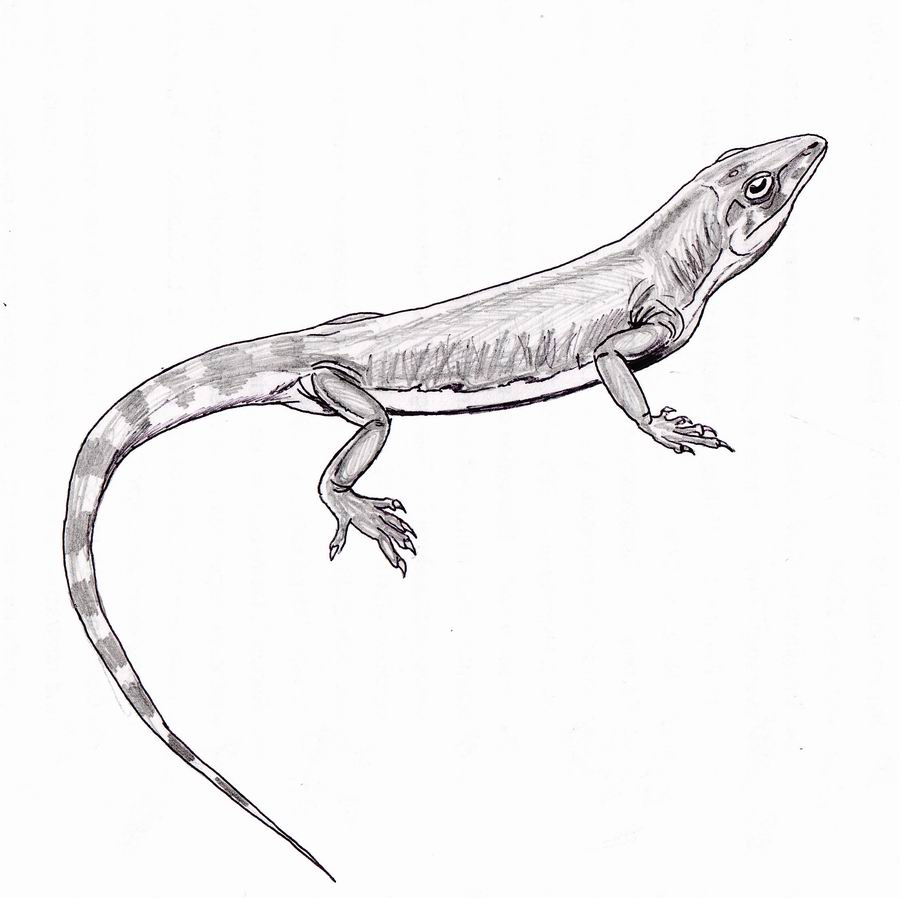
Life restoration

Archaeovenator is an extinct genus of Late Carboniferous varanopid synapsids known from Greenwood County, Kansas of the United States. It was first named by Robert R. Reisz and David W. Dilkes in 2003 and the type species is Archaeovenator hamiltonensis. Archaeovenator hamiltonensis is known from the holotype KUVP 12483, a three-dimensionally preserved, nearly complete and articulated skeleton, including the skull, with limbs and girdles slightly separated from postcranial skeleton. It was collected in the Hamilton Quarry, from the Calhouns Shale Formation of the Shawnee Group, dating to the Virgilian stage (or alternatively late Kasimovian to early Gzhelian stage) of the Late Pennsylvanian Series, about 300 million years ago. The generic name is derived from the Latin Archaeo and venator, meaning "ancient hunter". The specific name is named after its finding place Hamilton Quarry. Archaeovenator is one of the oldest known varanopid, though Dendromaia is known from older rocks.
