= Varanodon =

Varanodon Temporal range: Roadian
- Life restoration

Scientific classification
- Kingdom: Animalia
- Phylum: Chordata
- Clade: Synapsida
- Family: †Varanopidae
- Subfamily: †Varanopinae
- Genus: †Varanodon; Olson, 1965

Type species
- †Varanodon agilis Olson, 1965

Extinct genus of tetrapods

Varanodon is an extinct genus of amniotes from the family Varanopidae. It has been found in the Chickasha Formation of Oklahoma, which dates to the Roadian stage of the Middle Permian. The largest varanopid known at the time of its description, with a skull length of 17.5 centimetres (6.9 in), it was closely related to and lived alongside its much larger relative Watongia. The two may represent growth stages of a single animal.

== See also ==
- List of pelycosaurs
