= Elbridge Ayer Burbank =

American painter (1858–1949)

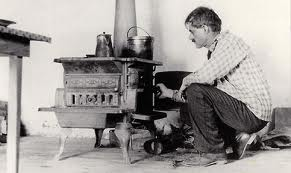
- Burbank in 1904
- Born: April 10, 1858; Harvard, Illinois, United States
- Died: March 21, 1949 (aged 90); San Francisco, California, United States
- Education: Chicago Academy of Design
- Relatives: Edward E. Ayer (maternal uncle)

Elbridge Ayer Burbank (April 10, 1858 – March 21, 1949) (AKA E. A. Burbank} was an American artist who sketched and painted more than 1200 portraits of Native Americans from 125 tribes. He studied art in Chicago and in his 30s traveled to Munich, Germany, for additional studies with notable German artists.

He is believed to be the only person to paint the war chief Geronimo from life.

== Early life and education ==
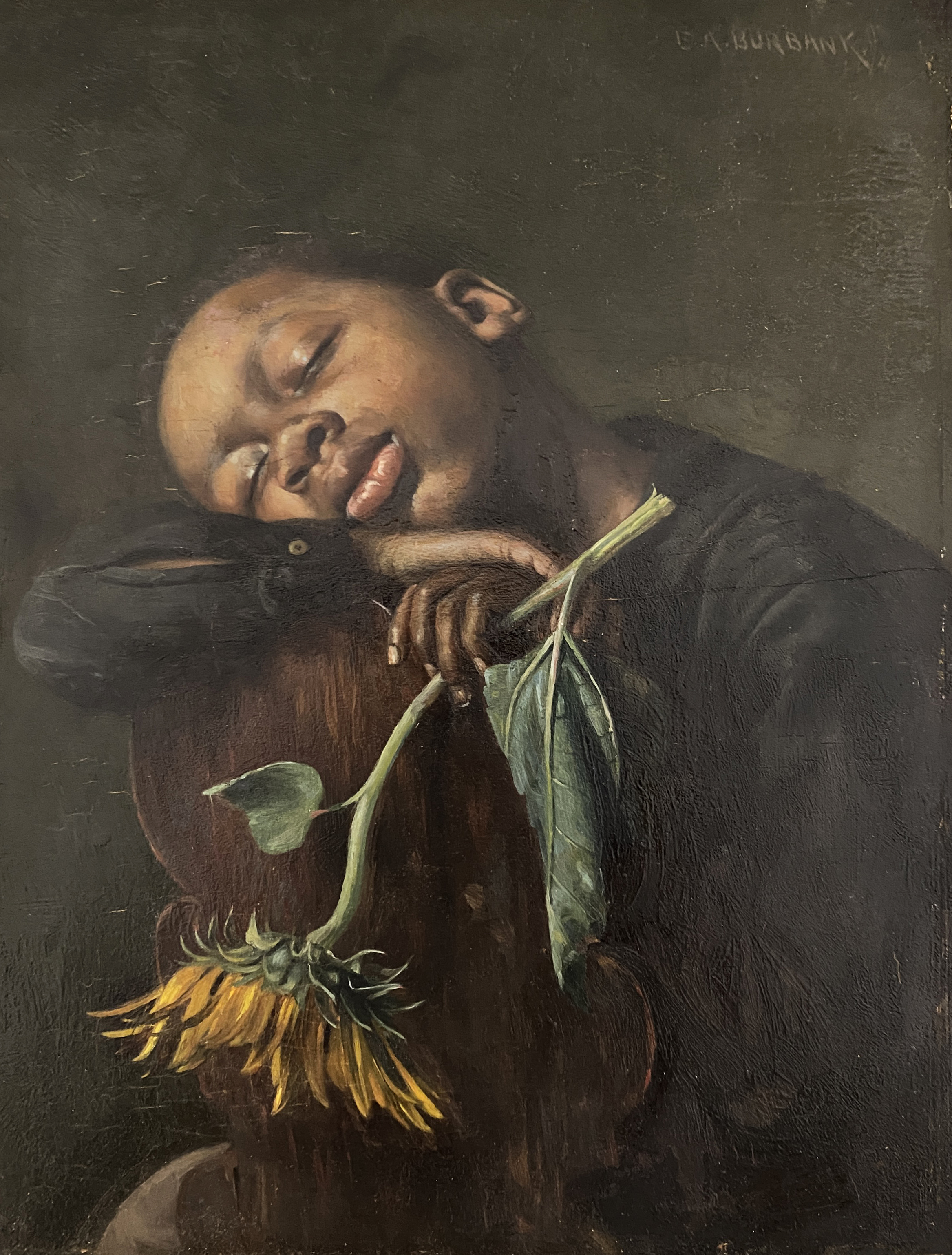
The Sunflower, 1894, oil on panel

Elbridge was born on April 10, 1858, in Harvard, Illinois, to Anna Maria (Ayer) and Abner Jewett Burbank. After attending public schools, he studied art at the Chicago Academy of Design, where he was influenced by Leonard Volk and graduated in 1874.

His maternal uncle Edward E. Ayer was a successful business magnate, museum philanthropist and antiquarian collector of materials related to the history and ethnology of Native American peoples at the time of European encounter. His collection, one of the founding donations to the Newberry Library in Chicago, contains a number of Burbank's works.

== Career ==
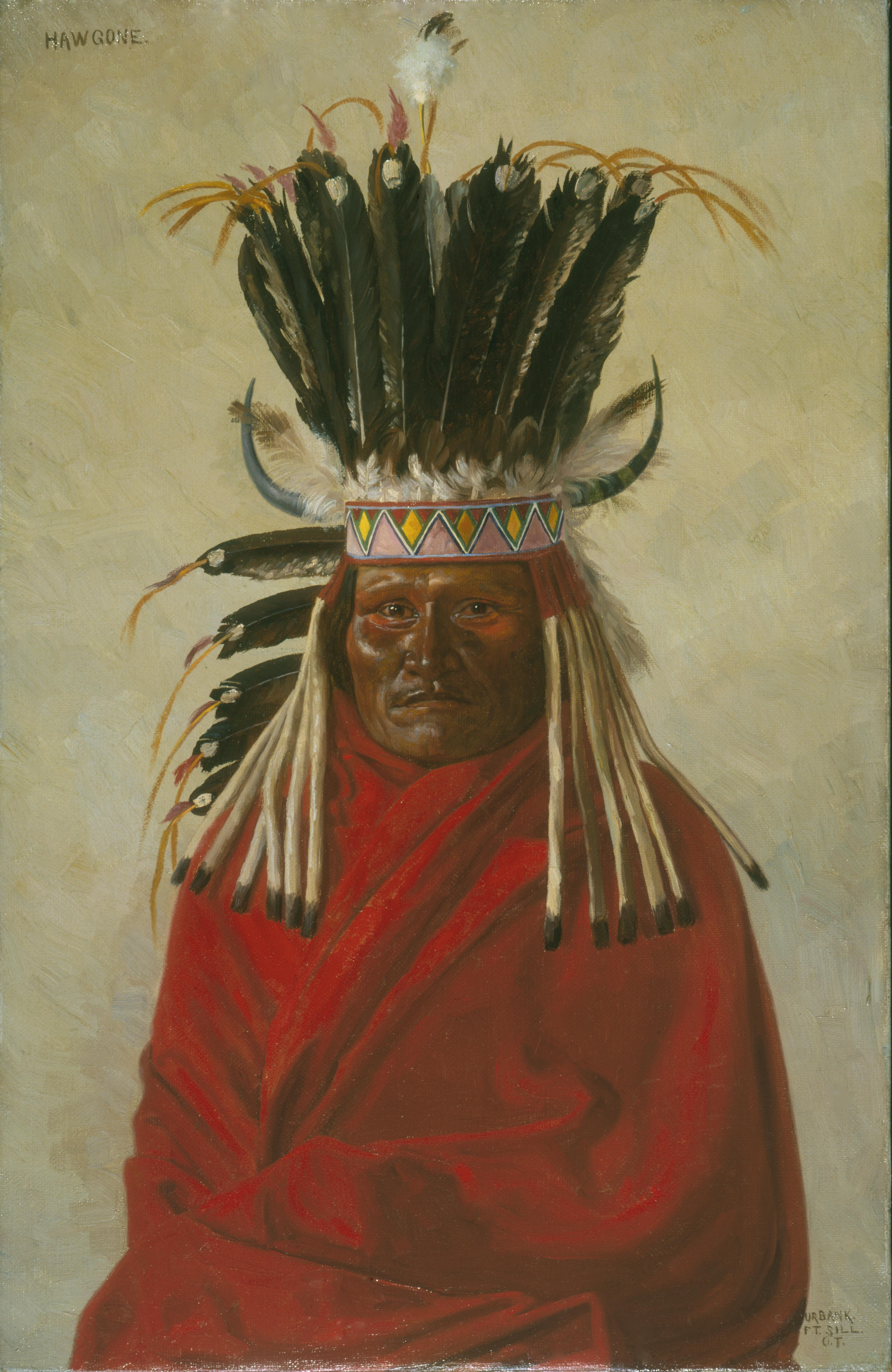
Burbank's portrait of Silver Horn

Burbank arranged for two periods of extended study in Munich, Germany, with notable artists. In 1886-87 he studied with Paul Navin and Frederick Fehr. He returned a few years later, in 1889-90 with Toby Rosenthal. He also traveled to Oberammergau, Germany and Cardiff, Wales.

Burbank was the only artist to paint the War Chief Geronimo from life. He painted or sketched more than 1,200 Native Americans from 125 tribes. Over a period of several years, he spent many months at the Hubbell Trading Post, where he studied and painted Native Americans.

Burbank, Oklahoma, is named after him.

In 1910, the Editor of The Harvard Independent noted: "No other artist in the country has enjoyed the opportunities experienced by Mr. E. A. Burbank, now a resident of Los Angeles - the painter of Indian portraits, to meet face to face, and on their own ground, the once noted Indian chiefs America now so rapidly passing away. For the last twenty years Mr. Burbank has journeyed from camp to camp among the aborigines of the northwest and southwest, painting successively all the great warriors whose prowess has made their names famous in frontier history. It is, therefore, with considerable pride that The Graphic calls attention to a series of articles from Mr. Burbank's pen, describing his personal interviews with these once-powerful war chiefs, and illustrated by portraits from life, re-drawn in pencil especially for the Graphic, from his original studies. First in this notable galaxy was a picture and story of Red Cloud, the famous Ogallalla (sic) Sioux, recently deceased. Geronimo, the noted Apache chief who preceded Red Cloud the happy hunting grounds by a few months, followed".

As an adult, Burbank was diagnosed with bipolar disorder, referred to then as "manic depression". He was treated at several different facilities during his life, most notably for more than ten years at the State Mental Hospital in Napa, California.

He died April 21, 1949, in San Francisco, California, after being struck and severely injured by a cable car on January 27. The accident occurred in front of the Manx Hotel (now the Villa Florence). He was first buried at Mt. Olivet Memorial Park, San Francisco, California, but his remains were reinterred at Forest View Abby in Rockford, Illinois. In 1984 relatives had his remains moved and reinterred at Mount Auburn Cemetery, Harvard, Illinois.

== Son of the Shadow-Maker ==
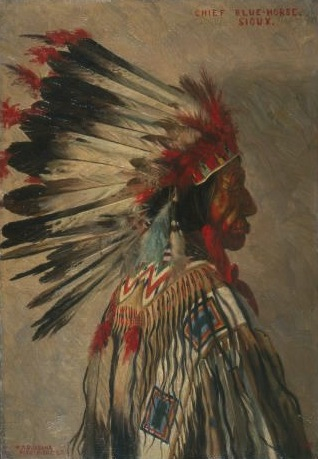
Chief Blue Horse, E. A. Burbank, 1898

In 1898, Burbank became friends with Chief Blue Horse when he was visiting the Oglala Lakota at Pine Ridge Agency. Burbank painted sitting portraits of the greatest Native American leaders, including Geronimo, Red Cloud and Chief Joseph. At the time, Chief Blue Horse was eighty years of age and rode each day on his horse to pose for Burbank, who he called "Son of the Shadow-Maker". Burbank was also an historian and his fond recollections illuminate Chief Blue Horse. "Hardly a day passed without Blue Horse coming to my studio to visit me. He would sit down and smoke a little, short, strong pipe and gossip with the other Indians present; all the time he was talking he would be fanning himself with the wing of a turkey. His face usually was painted red, and he wore all the Indian clothes he had, with a single feather on his head. He was a thorough Indian, and extremely kind-hearted. His principal object in life was to try to make others happy around him".

== Works ==
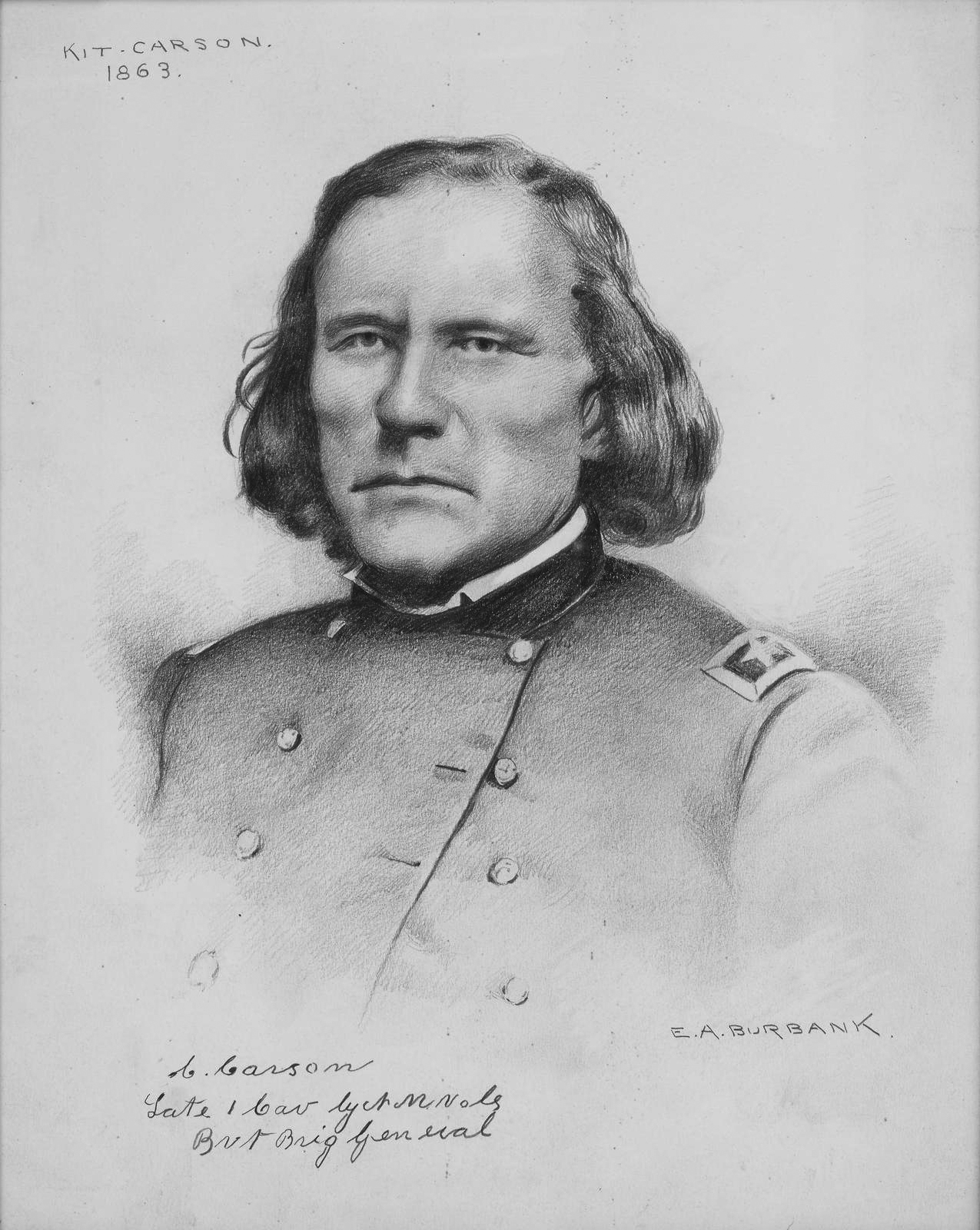
Kit Carson, after a photograph

Lake Geneva, Wisconsin - Pencil Sketch - c. 1875
Munich Sketchbook - c. 1887/1889/1890
Hall in Old House - Pencil Sketch - 1892
Portrait of a Woman - Oil on Canvas - 1892
Wha' Foh you' Laff'n - 1897
The Old Breastpin - 1897
Contented - 1897
Reading - 1897
Little Ruth - 1897
Chief Geronimo - Apache - 1897
Ah-ge-pah - Navajo - 1897
Bon-i-ta - Comanche - 1897
Chasing Alone - 1897
Chief Joseph - Nez Perces - 1897
Chief Medicine Crow - Crow - 1897
Chief Pretty-eagle - Crow - 1897
Chief Red-cloud - Sioux - 1897
Chief Tja-yo-ni - Navajo - 1897
Chosequah - Comanche - 1897
Has-tin-nez - Navajo - 1897
Hawgone - Kiowa - 1897
Holds the Enemy - Crow - 1897
Sees a White Horse - Crow - 1897
She Rides a Plain Horse - Crow - 1897
Si-We-Ka - Pueblo - 1897
Ton-hadle-ico - Kiowa - 1897
White Swan - Crow - 1897

Ah-ge-pah - Navajo - 1898
Ah-guy-ah - Moqui- 1898
Baratchia - Ute - 1898
Black - Arapahoe - 1898
Bob-Tailed Coyote - Southern Cheyenne - 1898
Chief Antonio - Apache - 1898
Chief Blue Horse - Sioux - 1898
Chief Burnt-all-over - Southern Cheyenne - 1898
Chief Chi-hua-hua - Apache - 1898
Chief Chiquito - Apache - 1898
Chief Es-Kin-Nas-Pas - Apache - 1898
Chief Joseph - Nez Perces - 1898
Chief Little Wound - Sioux - 1898
Chief Medicine Grass - Arapahoe - 1898
Chief Nah-kuh-mah-time - Southern Cheyenne - 1898
Chief Naiche - Apache - 1898
Chief Severo - Southern Ute - 1898
Chief Tal-klai - Apache - 1898
Chief War Path - Arapahoe - 1898
E-ney - Apache - 1898
E-wa - Apache - 1898
Eagle Nest - Southern Cheyenne - 1898
Geronimo - Apache - 1898
Has-kin-es-tee - Apache - 1898
Ho-mo-vi - Moqui - 1898
Hong-ee - Moqui - 1898
It-say-ya - Zuni - 1898
Kah-Kap-Tee - Moqui - 1898
Ko-Pe-Ley - Moqui - 1898
Lot-si-te-sah - Zuni - 1898
Ma-u-rita - Zuni - 1898
Nad-kah - Apache - 1898
Na-goze de-tah - Apache - 1898
Ni-Yang-I-Mana - Moqui - 1898
No-Flesh - Sioux - 1898
O-bah - Moqui - 1898
Pah-Puh - Moqui - 1898
Pay-tah - Moqui - 1898
Quin-cha-ke-cha - Southern Ute - 1898
Red Wolf - Arapahoe - 1898
Scah-e-ah - Apache - 1898
Short Teeth - Southern Cheyenne - 1898
Shu-Pe-La - Moqui - 1898
Standing Bull - Southern Cheyenne - 1898
Straight-Crazy - Arapahoe - 1898
Tah-ah-rah and Juane - Ute - 1898
Tah-bo-ho-ya - Moqui - 1898
Tre-re-kah - Mojave - 1898
Weasel Tail - Southern Cheyenne - 1898
Wick-Ah-Te-Wah - Moqui - 1898
Wick-Ey - Moqui - 1898
Woide-yah - 1898
Zy-You-Wah - Moqui - 1898

Black Man - Arapahoe- 1899
Chief American Horse - Sioux - 1899
Chief Chat-O - Apache - 1899
Chief Chief Killer - Southern Cheyenne - 1899
Chief Flat Iron - Sioux - 1899
Chief Joseph - Nez Perces - 1899
Chief Loco - Apache - 1899
Chief Man-gus - Apache - 1899
Chief Naiche - Apache - 1899
Chief Red Fly - Sioux - 1899
Chief Spotted Elk - Sioux - 1899
Chief Stinking Bear - Sioux - 1899
Geronimo - Apache - 1899
Has-teen-e-ashe-ee - Navajo - 1899
Iron Crow - Sioux - 1899
Kicking Bear - Sioux - 1899
Lap-hi - Columbia - 1899
Medicine Woman - Southern Cheyenne - 1899
Pah-Bah-Ah-Gut - Ute - 1899
Red Woman - Southern Cheyenne - 1899
Sah-ah-lock-o - Moqui - 1899
She Comes Out First - Sioux - 1899
Sin-sin - Columbia - 1899
Standing Soldier - Sioux - 1899
Tli-Ich Na-Pa - Navajo - 1899
Ton-Had-Dle - Kiowa - 1899
Yat-yah-mosh-yet - Yackima - 1899

Ah-ke-ke-wah-tock - Sac and Fox - 1900
Ah-kis-kuck - Kickapoo - 1900
Chief Keokuk - Sac and Fox - 1900
Chief Lo-waine-wag-she-kah - Shawnee - 1900
Chief Wee-te-luck - Nomelackie - 1900
Mac-ke-puck-e-the - Kickapoo - 1900
Sha-Ah-Lock-O - Hopi - 1900
Zuquish - Laguna Pueblo - 1900

Chief Black-Coyote - Arapaho - 1901
Chief Burnt-all-over - Southern Cheyenne - 1901
Chief Law-low-she-us - Modoc - 1901
Chief Mah-ing-gah - Ottawa - 1901
Chief Naw-quag-ke-shick - Ottawa - 1901

A-a-wa - Hopi - 1904
Che-Ke-Ah-Pe-Kee - Hopi - 1904
Chief Kuehl-lah-y-e-mah - Hopi - 1904
Ho-Me-Hep-No-My - Tewa - 1904
Ho-mo-vi - Hopi - 1904
Ne-I-So-Meh - Yuma - 1904
Pah-Lah-Wool-Ey - Hopi - 1904
Paw-vietz-ah - Tewa - 1904
Poe-Shom-Ee - Tewa - 1904
Pole-lee - Hopi - 1904
Zahn-dah - Navajo - 1904

A-vay - Yuma-Apache - 1905
Antonio Martinay - Desert Cahuilla - 1905
Ap-kaw - Pima - 1905
Ben-a la-chah-ah - Agua Caliente - 1905
Be-tow - Temecula - 1905
Blah-se-dah - Soboba - 1905
Chat-ah - Chimevava - 1905
Chief Whan - Pima - 1905
Cle-o-vah - Agua Caliente - 1905
Francisco - Sobaba - 1905
Gailey - Hopi - 1905
Ho-say-da-loris-cap-is-trano - San Felippo - 1905
Ho-say-Domingo - Cahuilla - 1905
Ho-se-pah - San Felipe - 1905
Ho-seph-ah - Desert Cahuilla - 1905
Jau-ro - Cahuilla - 1905
Juan Ramon - Seranno - 1905
Kar-nah-co-nah - Pima - 1905
Kuel-lah-y-e-mah - Hopi - 1905
Le-van-us - Soboba - 1905
Le-vra-do - Soboba - 1905
Lu-ise-ah - Papago - 1905
Lu-is Suberano - Pala - 1905
Mah-so-lin-a-quasis - San Luis Rey - 1905
Mer-say-no las-kes - 1905
Morongo - Seranno - 1905
Nan-kah - Hopi - 1905
Pay-tray - Temecula - 1905
Ponc-te-mah - Hopi - 1905
Pum-ah-o-key-wah - Mohave - 1905
Ramona - Desert Cahuilla - 1905
Rap-a-hoe - Yuma Apache - 1905
Ro-sin-da - Agua Caliente - 1905
Sal-va-zar - 1905
Scat-skah - Pima - 1905
Se-var-i-o-ne-vas-ky - Yaqui - 1905
See-he-nach-ee - Papago - 1905
Skoung-o-vah - Hopi - 1905
So-li-da - Soboba - 1905
Su-sah-lie - Seranno - 1905
Ter-e-sa - San Ignacio - 1905
Tow-mas - San Ignacio - 1905
Tow-mas-cisco - Seranno - 1905
Ur-mar-tah - Agua Caliente - 1905
Whanah - Desert Cahuilla - 1905
Wong-ge-tow-ee - Chimovave - 1905

Ach - Mojave - 1906
Cal-bert-tin - Ukiah - 1906
Cal-lah-hob-nah - Ukiah - 1906
Calp-ah-day-o - Poma - 1906
Che kah - Tejon - 1906
Cheney - Pomo - 1906
Chief Lo-waine-wag-she-kah - Shawnee - 1906
Chief Pah-meh-mah - Ukie - 1906
Chief Sool-ah-boo - Ukiah - 1906
Coo-koo-lah - 1906
Deloris Lachap - Digeno - 1906
Do-min-ga - Tejon - 1906
Downsen - Meuwock - 1906
E-lanar - Desert Cahuilla - 1906
Ech-o-ney - Ukie - 1906
Es-pran-sah - San Luis Rey - 1906
Ey-sey-beh - Tejon - 1906
Fo-e-nah - Meteneck - 1906
Gah-kah-che - Washoe - 1906
Hah-re-naldo - Tejon - 1906
Hey-dahm Ho-lo-shoe-ey - Ukie - 1906
Hub-bah - Pomo - 1906
Hul-kush - Kobalthnent - 1906
Im-who-che-che - Shoshom - 1906
Jose - South Fork Piute - 1906
Jose Carac - San Luis Rey - 1906
K-lum-pah - Kabahimen - 1906
Ka-kah-simm - Napa - 1906
Kahl-bah - Poma - 1906
Kal-tah-had-dah - Coo-koo-lah - 1906
Karlabie - Nomelacki - 1906
Katl-le-got - Wylackie - 1906
Kay-kah-nall - Ukiah - 1906
Ki-e-tah - South Fork Paiute - 1906
Kisc-see - Wylackie - 1906
Ko-see-yah - Kabahimen - 1906
Lah-gah-wood-ey - Mad River - 1906
Lah-see - Jule River - 1906
Lah-see-know-bush - Wylackie - 1906
Mad-dy - Washoe - 1906
Mah-tel-lo - Mohave - 1906
May-dy - Washoe - 1906
Mu-lack - Digger - 1906
Na-gay-rooch - 1906
Nache-luch-pe - Na-Po - 1906
Nah-clic-tah - Hoopa - 1906
Nah-hahn-trum - Tejon - 1906
Nar-see-so-lapacha - Diegueno - 1906
Navol - Tejon - 1906
Ooch-u-ha-wah - Mohave - 1906
Peck-an-billie - Lower Klamath - 1906
Pu-el-we-tah - Sun Pum - 1906
Red Wood - 1906
Ree-kaw-kah - Mad River - 1906
Rhodie - Ukiah Saiaz - 1906
Say-kah-nee-ah - Maidu - 1906
Schlah-asch-she - Mad River - 1906
Se-pran-sah - San Luis Rey - 1906
Se-te-ah-kah - San Luis Rey - 1906
Se-var-i-o Ne-vas-ky - Yaqui - 1906
Shock-o-wah - 1906
Show-my-nie - Maidu - 1906
Shy-two-bem-dah - Coo-Koo-Lah - 1906
Teese - Ukiah - 1906
Tehachapi - 1906
Ter-e-sa - San Ignacio - 1906
Toc-chu-chu - Tule River - 1906
Tock-bo-ree-ah-kigh-ah - Ukiah - 1906
Two-see-o - Tejon - 1906
Wah-kane - Panamint - 1906
Yam-wee - Maidu - 1906
Yo-yon-ah - Mad River - 1906

Be-na-nee - Navajo - 1907
Chief Jat-jal-i-na-tloi - Navajo - 1907
Chief Many Horses - Navajo - 1907
Chief Pesh-la-cai - Navajo - 1907
Chief Servero - Ute - 1907
Estzan-lopa - Navajo - 1907
Hosh-cane-ah-sure-it - Navajo - 1907
Miguelito (red point) Ya-otza beg-ay - Navajo - 1907
Pestrlacia-baad - Navajo - 1907
Quie-ithas-ha - Navajo - 1907
Sam-mon - Navajo - 1907
Stahl-lah-che-bi-nelly - Navajo - 1907
Stah-mah-chiz-bi-nelly - Navajo - 1907
Tlo-bi-nelli - Navajo - 1907
Ton-ti-tah - Navajo - 1907
Tpapa-a - Navajo - 1907
Tsoy-ash-ee - Navajo - 1907
Zan-ey - Navajo - 1907
Zahn-eh - Navajo - 1907

Beckashi holoni baad - Navajo - 1908
Char-ah - Walpi - 1908
Chief Bai-lish - Apache - 1908
Chief Burnt-all-over - Cheyenne - 1908
Chief Chico - South Fork Paiute - 1908
Chief Chiquito - Apache - 1908
Chief Coffee - Yuma Apache - 1908
Chief Grey Hair - Crow - 1908
Chief Jat-jal-i-ni-tloi - Navajo - 1908
Chief Keokuk - Sac and Fox - 1908
Chief Manuelito - Navajo - 1908
Chief Sitting-bull - Sioux - 1908
Chief Two-moon - Cheyenne - 1908
Chis-chili - Navajo - 1908
Geronimo - Apache - 1908
Estzan-nez - Navajo - 1908
Gi-aum-e Hon-o-me-tah - Kiowa - 1908
Hoe'-dah - Isleta Pueblo - 1908
Kah-eh - Moqui - 1908
Kah-lah-cha - Moqui - 1908
Kahl-uh - Moqui - 1908
Ko-cha-mana - Moqui - 1908
Lap-hi - Columbia - 1908
Naiche - Apache - 1908
Nom-pay-eh - Tewa - 1908
None-ah-say - Santa Clara - 1908
Oach - Mojave - 1908
Quo-tah - Pueblo - 1908
Schule - Mohave - 1908
Tah-ho-man-ah - Hopi - 1908
Tla-i-ashi - Navajo - 1908
Ton-ti-tah - Navajo - 1908
Ton-to - Navajo - 1908

Ah-co-ahn-ney - Santa Clara - 1909
Apache - Navajo - 1909
Coe-y-shone - Zia Pueblo - 1909
Cy-strut-ey - Santa Ana Pueblo - 1909
Der-we-low-yellow - Taos - 1909
Domingo-me-ah - Isleta Pueblo - 1909
Emanuel-tenorio - San Felipe Pueblo - 1909
Geronimo - Apache - 1909
Hah-not-ie - Acoma - 1909
Han-nah-toe - Tesuque - 1909
Heugh-tah - Picuris - 1909
Ho-say-da-loris-cap-is-trano - San Felipe - 1909
Ke-veh-jah - Santo Domingo - 1909
Lusiano-lujan - Sandia Pueblo - 1909
Mah-re-ah - Campo - 1909
Mah-t - Felipe Pueblo - 1909
Moe-eh-ahn-yeh - Nambe - 1909
Moly-e-ano - Ute - 1909
Mon-well - Jicarilla Apache - 1909
Oah-montoya - Jicarilla Apache - 1909
O-chin - Jemez - 1909
Oeh-whem-eh - Picuris - 1909
O-ku-ah-syd-eh - San Ildefonso Pueblo - 1909
Pack-ah-me-toe - Hualapai - 1909
Pah-que - Sandia Pueblo - 1909
Paph - Taos - 1909
Pog-Ah-Ninnie-Ah-Ey - Santa Clara - 1909
Quan-o-p - San Juan - 1909
See-ley - Laguna - 1909
Se-o-low-o - Cochiti Pueblo - 1909
Se-o-we-meh - Zia Pueblo - 1909
Te-o-whe-low - Tesuque - 1909
Teyn-you-soum-wy - Nambe - 1909
Tom-pes-now-ah - San Juan - 1909
Wah-k-no - Campo - 1909
Whe-shing - Jemez Pueblo - 1909
Yah-me-yeh - Laguna - 1909
Zui-sti-yallah - Hualapai - 1909

Bitagu-Lichi-Bitzi - Navajo - 1910
Estzan-lapa - Navajo - 1910
Estzan-Nap-Pa - Navajo - 1910
Hastiin-Nez - Navajo - 1910
Neh-az-bah - Navajo - 1910
Nez-ze-gig-ge - Navajo - 1910
Tlo-Be-Nel-Ly - Navajo - 1910
Two-he - Navajo - 1910

Native American Child, St.Michaels (school)-1910

=== Tribes portrayed ===
- Acoma
- Agua Caliente
- Akimel O'odham
- Apache
- Arapahoe
- Cahuilla
- Campo
- Cheyenne
- Chimevava
- Cochiti Pueblo
- Umatilla
- Comanche
- Coo-Koo-Lah
- Crow
- Desert Calmilla
- Desert Cahuilla
- Diegueno
- Digeno
- Southern Paiute
- Hualapai
- Hopi
- Hoopa
- Pueblo
- Jemez
- Jicarilla Apache
- Jule River
- Kabahimen
- Kickapoo
- Kiowa
- Kobalthnent
- Laguna Pueblo
- Lower Klamath
- Mad River
- Maidu
- Meteneck
- Miwok
- Modoc
- Mohave
- Moqui
- Na-Po
- Nambe
- Napa
- Navajo
- Nez Perce
- Nomelacki
- Odawa
- Panamint
- Pala
- Picuris
- Pomo
- Sac and Fox
- San Felipe
- San Felippo
- San Ignacio
- San Luis Rey
- Sandia Pueblo
- Santa Ana Pueblo
- Tewa
- Seranno
- Shawnee
- Sioux
- Soboba
- South Fork Paiute
- Southern Cheyenne
- Sun Pum
- Ute
- Tejon
- Temecula
- Tewa
- Tohono O’dham
- Tule River
- Yuki
- Ukiah Saiaz
- Ukie
- Washoe
- Wylackie
- Yackima
- Yaqui
- Yuma
- Zia Pueblo
- Zuni

=== Holding institutions ===
- Art Institute of Chicago
- American Museum of Natural History
- Beinecke Rare Book and Manuscript Library - Yale University
- Butler Institute of American Art
- C. M. Russell Museum
- Harvard-Diggins Library
- Hearst Art Gallery, Saint Mary's College of California
- The Huntington Library, Art Collections, and Botanical Gardens
- Hubbell Trading Post National Historic Site - National Park Service
- Luther Burbank Home & Gardens
- Museum of the America West
- Newberry Library
- Peabody Museum of Archeology and Ethnology - Harvard University
- Phoenix Art Museum
- Rockford Art Museum
- Smithsonian American Art Museum
