= Elbridge (given name) =

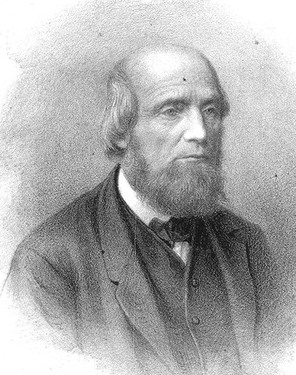
E. W. Locke in 1873

Elbridge is a masculine given name. Notable people with the name include:

- Elbridge Van Syckel Besson (1839–1915), American politician
- Elbridge Boyden (1810–1898), American architect
- Elbridge Streeter Brooks (1846–1902), American author, editor and critic
- Elbridge "Al" Bryant, former member of the singing group The Temptations
- Elbridge Ayer Burbank (1858–1949), American artist
- Elbridge Chapman (1895–1954), United States Army major general
- Elbridge Colby (born 1979), American government official during the Trump administration
- Elbridge Durbrow (1903–1997), American diplomat, ambassador to South Vietnam from 1957 to 1961
- Elbridge Gerry (disambiguation)
- Elbridge Hanecy (1852–1925), American lawyer, politician and judge
- Elbridge G. Lapham (1814–1890), American politician
- Elbridge Willis Moore (1857–1938), American painter, photographer and gallery owner
- Elbridge Robinson (1844–1918), American Civil War soldier awarded the Medal of Honor
- Elbridge Ross (1909–1980), American Olympic ice hockey player
- Elbridge G. Spaulding (1809–1897), American lawyer, banker and politician
- Elbridge Amos Stuart (1856–1944), American milk industrialist and creator of Carnation evaporated milk
- Elbridge Trask (1815–1863), American fur trapper
