= Tejon =

Tejon may refer to:

- Tejon, California
- Fort Tejon, California
- Tejon Pass
- Tejón, a Mexican name for Coati, an animal in the raccoon family
- Tejon Indian Tribe of California
