= Field Museum of Natural History =

Natural history museum in Chicago, Illinois

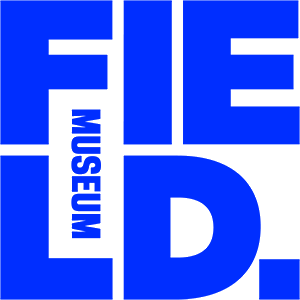

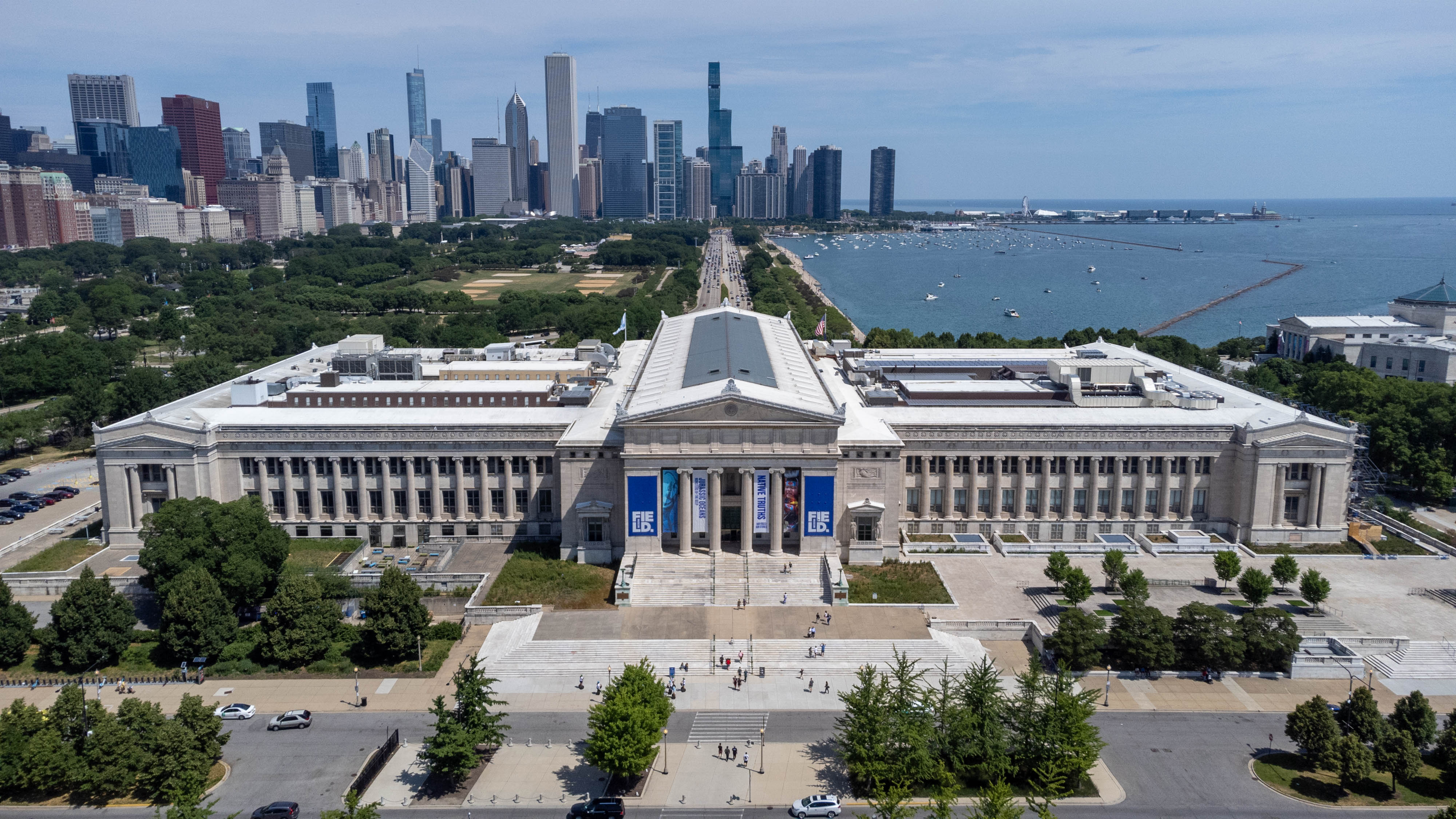
- The southern façade of the Field Museum in 2022.

- Location within Chicago metropolitan area Location within Illinois Location within the United States
- Established: June 2, 1894; 132 years ago
- Location: Near South Side, Chicago, Illinois, United States
- Coordinates: 41°51′58″N 87°37′01″W
- Type: Public–private partnership Natural history museum
- Visitors: 1,018,000 (2022)
- President: Julian Siggers
- Public transit access: Metra ME; South Shore Line at Museum Campus/11th Street; Roosevelt; Red Orange Green
- Website: fieldmuseum.org
- Field Museum of Natural History
- U.S. National Register of Historic Places
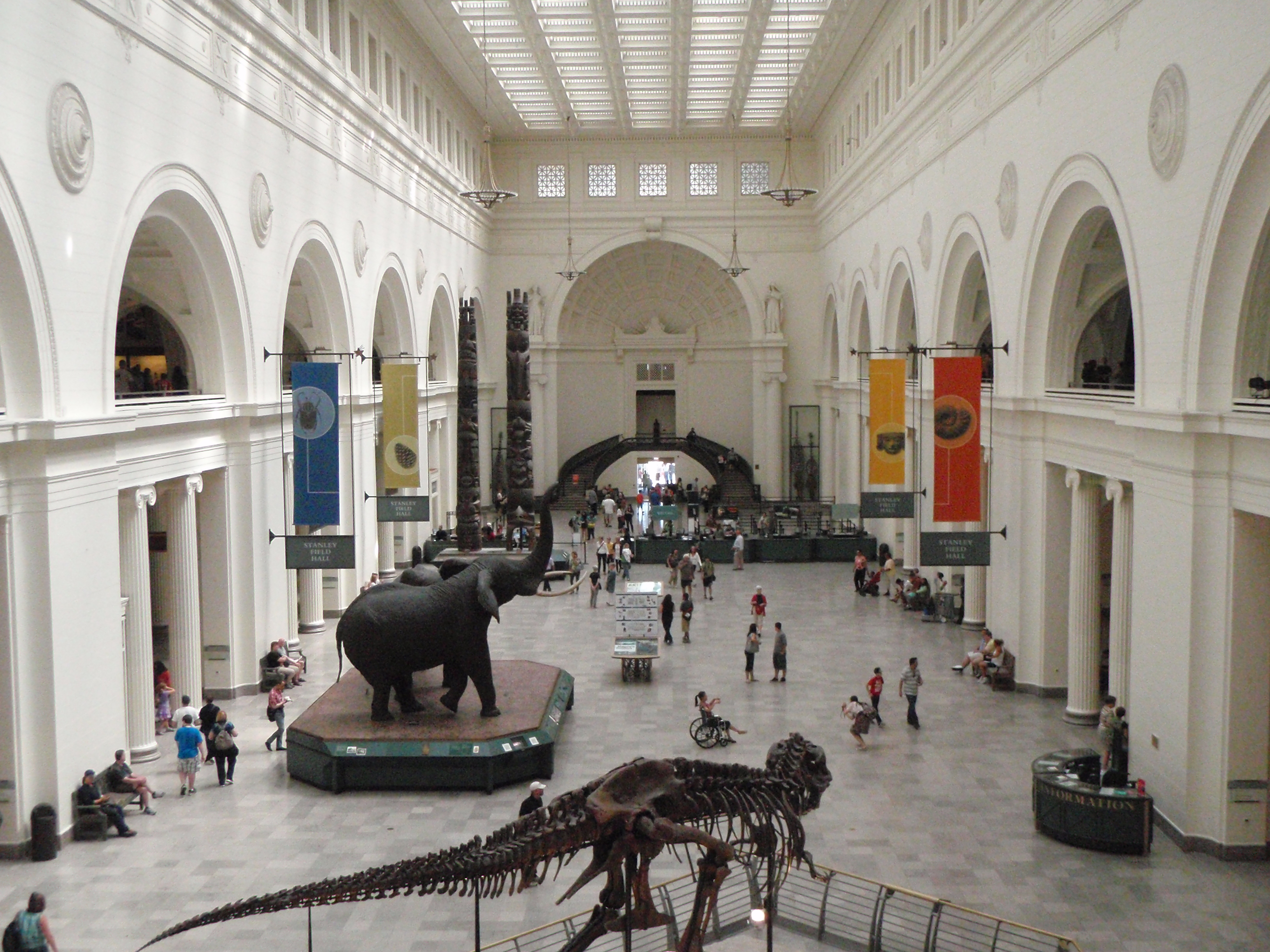
- Stanley Field Hall
- Built: 1921; 105 years ago
- Architects: Daniel Burnham, Pierce Anderson
- Architectural style: Classical Revival
- NRHP reference No.: 75000647
- Added to NRHP: September 5, 1975

The Field Museum of Natural History (FMNH; also known as the Field Museum) is a private–public natural history museum in Chicago, Illinois, and is one of the largest such museums in the world. The museum is popular for the size and quality of its educational and scientific programs, as well as its extensive scientific specimen and artifact collections.

A private nonprofit institution, the museum operates in close partnership with the municipal government agency Chicago Park District, which owns the land and building. The museum is run by a private Board of Trustees and funded through a combination of ticket sales, memberships, donations, endowments, and grants, along with some public funding for specific programs or maintenance.

The permanent exhibitions, which attract up to 2 million visitors annually, include fossils, current cultures from around the world, and interactive programming demonstrating today's urgent conservation needs. The museum is named in honor of its first major benefactor, Marshall Field, the department-store magnate. The museum and its collections originated from the 1893 World's Columbian Exposition and the artifacts displayed at the fair.

The museum maintains a temporary exhibition program of traveling shows, as well as in-house produced topical exhibitions. The professional staff maintains collections of over 24 million specimens and objects that provide the basis for the museum's scientific-research programs. These collections include the full range of existing biodiversity, gemstones, meteorites, fossils, and extensive anthropological collections and cultural artifacts from around the globe. The museum's library, which contains over 275,000 books, journals, and photo archives focused on biological systematics, evolutionary biology, geology, archaeology, ethnology and material culture, supports the museum's academic-research faculty and exhibit development.

The academic faculty and scientific staff engage in field expeditions, in biodiversity and cultural research on every continent, in local and foreign student training, and in stewardship of the rich specimen and artifact collections. They work in close collaboration with public programming exhibitions and education initiatives.

== History ==
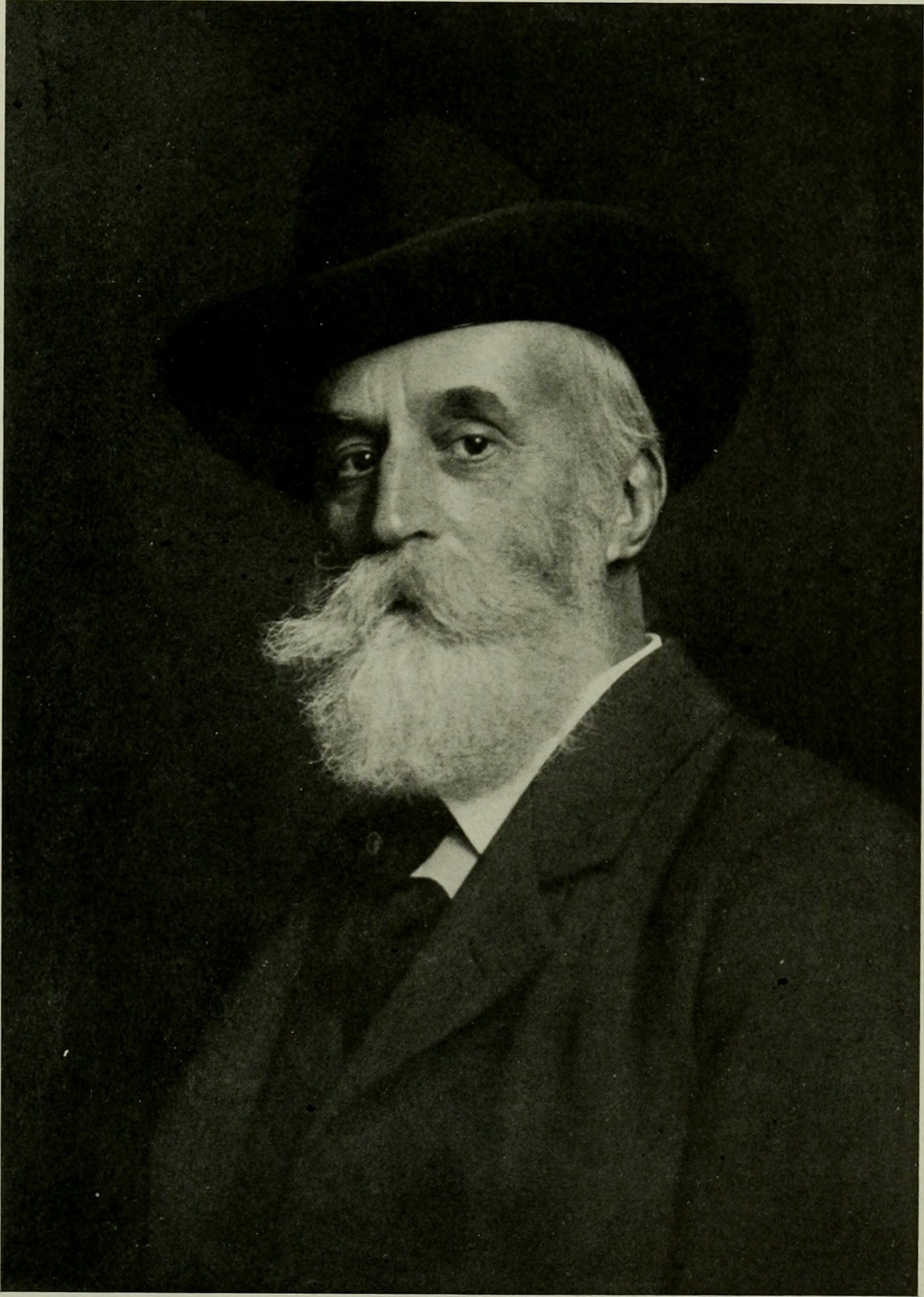
Daniel Giraud Elliot in 1897

In 1869, and before its formal establishment, the museum acquired the largest collection of birds and bird descriptions, from artist and ornithologist Daniel Giraud Elliot. In 1894, Elliot would become the curator of the Department of Zoology at the museum, where he worked until 1906.

To house the exhibits and collections assembled for the World's Columbian Exposition for future generations, Edward Ayer convinced the merchant Marshall Field to fund the establishment of a museum. Originally titled the Columbian Museum of Chicago in honor of its origins, the Field Museum was incorporated by the State of Illinois on September 16, 1893, for the purpose of the "accumulation and dissemination of knowledge, and the preservation and exhibition of artifacts illustrating art, archaeology, science and history". The Columbian Museum of Chicago occupied the only building remaining from the World's Columbian Exposition in Jackson Park, the Palace of Fine Arts. It is now home to the Chicago Museum of Science and Industry.

In 1905, the museum's name was changed to Field Museum of Natural History to honor its first major benefactor and to reflect its focus on the natural sciences.

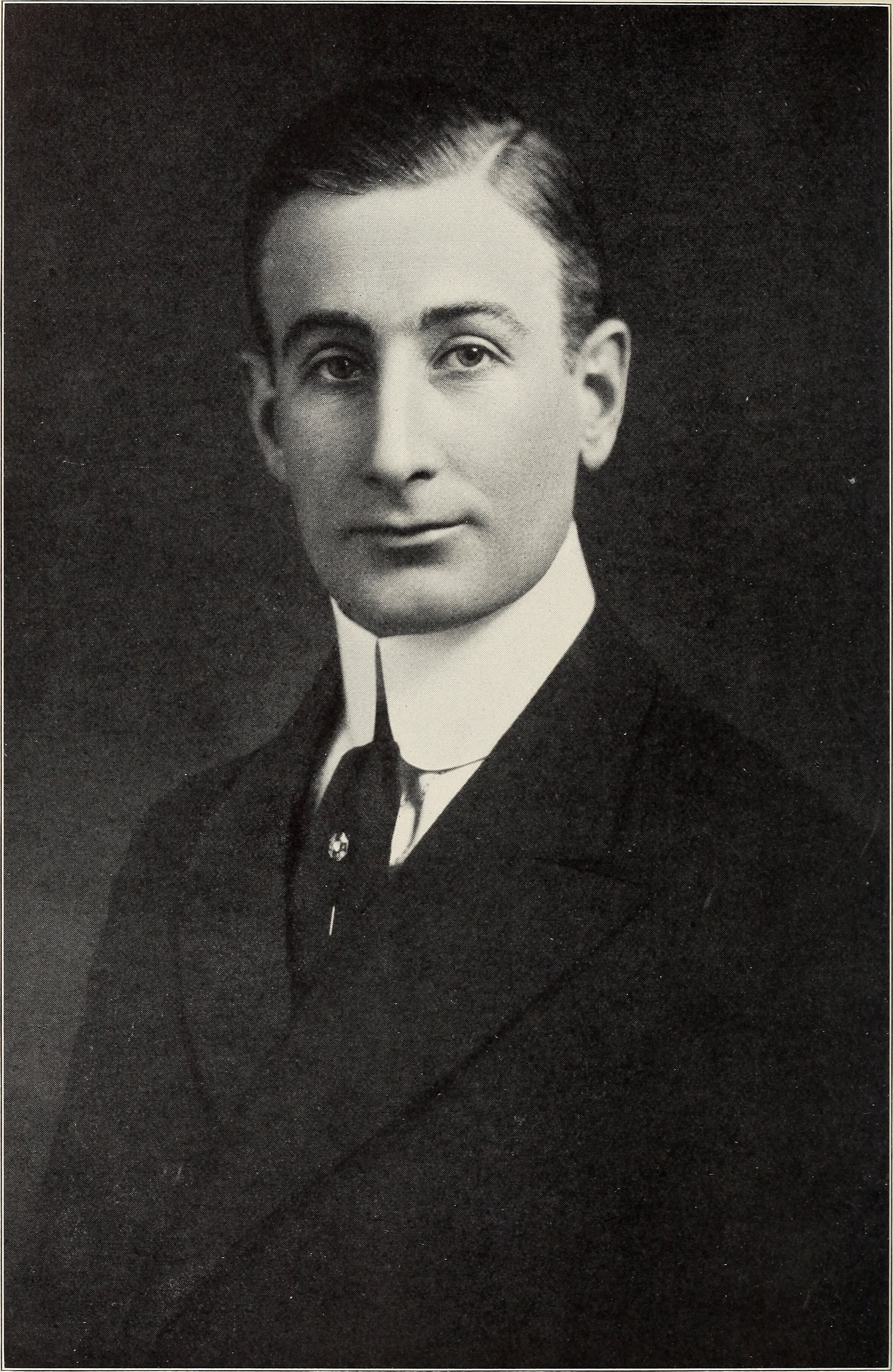
Stanley Field, Field Museum President, 1906

Stanley Field was the president in 1906.

During the period from 1943 to 1966, the museum was known as the Chicago Natural History Museum. In 1921, the Museum moved from its original location in Jackson Park to its present site on Chicago Park District property near downtown Chicago. By the late 1930s the Field Museum had emerged as one of the three premier museums in the United States, the other two being the American Museum of Natural History in New York City and the National Museum of Natural History at the Smithsonian Institution in Washington, DC.

The museum has maintained its reputation through continuous growth, expanding the scope of collections and its scientific research output, in addition to its award-winning exhibitions, outreach publications, and programs. The Field Museum is part of Chicago's lakefront Museum Campus that includes the John G. Shedd Aquarium and the Adler Planetarium.

In 2015, it was reported that an employee had defrauded the museum of $900,000 over a seven-year period to 2014.

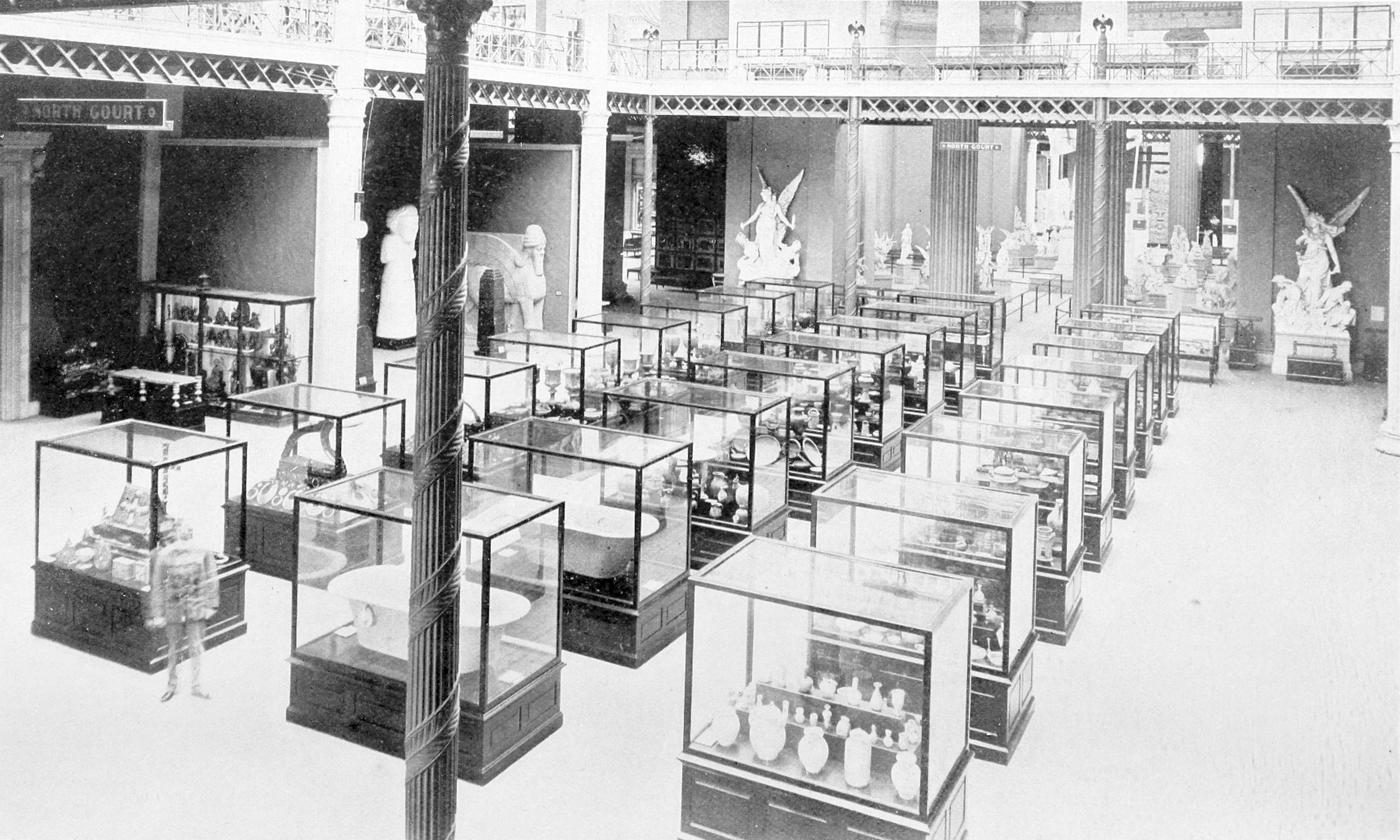
North Hall, circa 1895

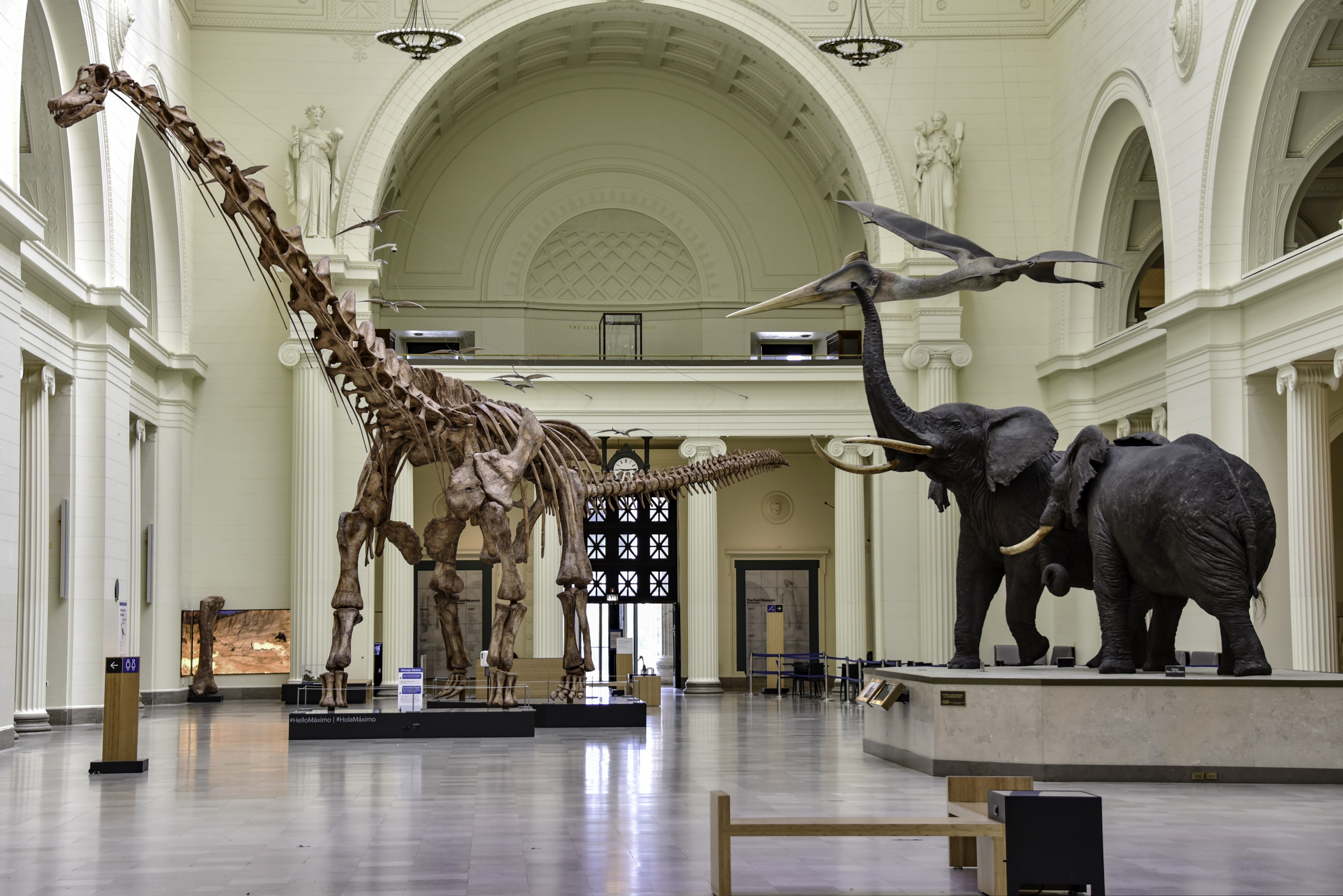
Stanley Field Hall in 2020

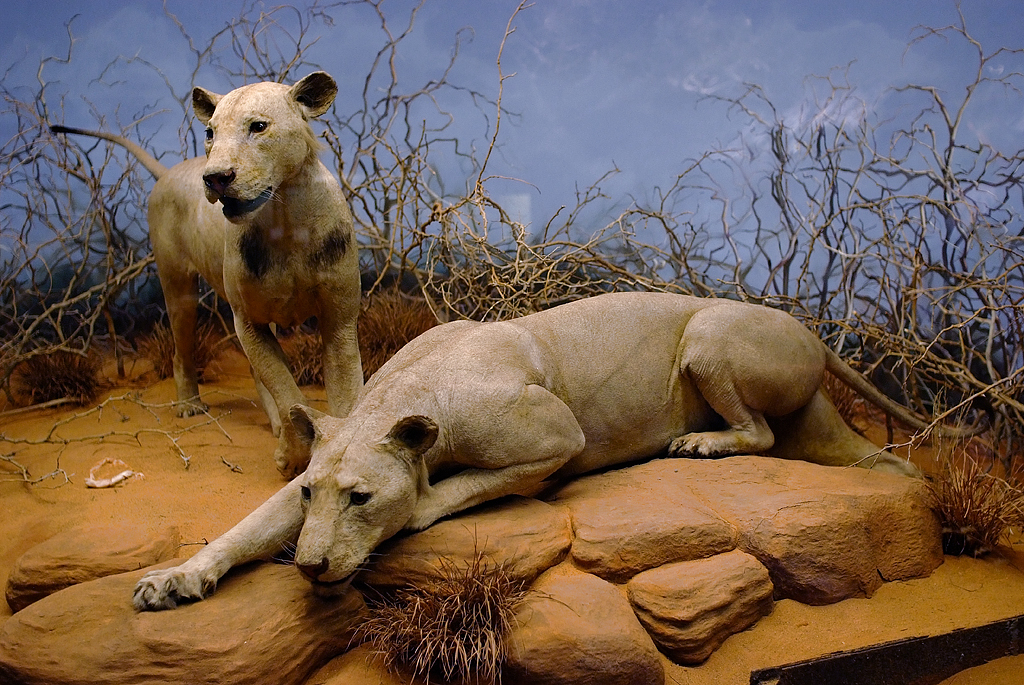
The Tsavo Maneaters on display in Mammals of Africa exhibit hall

== Attendance ==
The Museum received 1,018,002 visitors in 2022, ranking the 21st most-visited museum in the United States.

== Permanent exhibitions ==
=== Animal Halls ===
Animal exhibitions and dioramas such as Nature Walk, Mammals of Asia, and Mammals of Africa allow visitors an up-close look at the diverse habitats that animals inhabit. Most notably featured are the man-eating lions of Tsavo. The Mfuwe man eating lion is also on display.

Species represented in the Animal Halls	Gallery
Aardvark	Mammals of Africa
African Buffalo	Mammals of Africa
African Elephant	Stanley Field Hall
Alaskan Brown Bear	Messages from the Wilderness
Argali	Mammals of Asia
Barasingha	Mammals of Asia
Beaver	Messages from the Wilderness
Beisa Oryx	Mammals of Africa
Bengal Tiger	Mammals of Asia
Blackbuck Antelope	Mammals of Asia
Black Rhinoceros	Mammals of Africa
Black Wildebeest	Mammals of Africa
Bongo	Mammals of Africa
Burchell's Zebra	Mammals of Africa
Capybara	Messages from the Wilderness
Caribou	Messages from the Wilderness
Caribbean Manatee	Sea Mammals
Cattle Egret	Mammals of Asia
Cheetah	Mammals of Africa
Chital	Mammals of Asia
Common Eland	Mammals of Africa
Cougar	Messages from the Wilderness
Dibatag	Mammals of Africa
Lion	Mammals of Africa
Elephant Seal	Sea Mammals
Gaur	Mammals of Asia
Gelada Baboon	Mammals of Africa
Gerenuk	Mammals of Africa
Giant Anteater	Messages from the Wilderness
Giant Forest Hog	Mammals of Africa
Giant Panda	Mammals of Asia
Giant Sable Antelope	Mammals of Africa
Glacier Bear	Messages from the Wilderness
Grant's Gazelle	Mammals of Africa
Greater Kudu	Mammals of Africa
Guanocos	Messages from the Wilderness
Hog Deer	Mammals of Asia
Hyacinth Macaws	Messages from the Wilderness
Ibex	Mammals of Asia
Imperial Woodpecker	Messages from the Wilderness
Indian Gazelle	Mammals of Asia
Indian Rhinoceros	Mammals of Asia
Indian Sambar	Mammals of Asia
Jaguar	Messages from the Wilderness
Leopard	Mammals of Asia
Lesser Kudu	Mammals of Africa
Mantled Guereza	Mammals of Africa
Malay Tapir	Mammals of Asia
Marsh Deer	Messages from the Wilderness
Mexican Grizzly Bear	Messages from the Wilderness
Mountain Nyala	Mammals of Africa
Mule Deer	Messages from the Wilderness
Muskoxen	Messages from the Wilderness
Narwhal	Sea Mammals
Nilgai	Mammals of Asia
Northern Fur Seal	Sea Mammals
Orangutan	Mammals of Asia
Plains Zebra	Mammals of Africa
Polar Bear	Messages from the Wilderness
Proboscis Monkey	Mammals of Asia
Pronghorn	Messages from the Wilderness
Reticulated Giraffe	Mammals of Africa
Roosevelt Elk	Messages from the Wilderness
Sea Otter	Sea Mammals
Sloth Bear	Mammals of Asia
Snow Leopard	Mammals of Asia
Somali Wildass	Mammals of Africa
Spotted Hyena	Mammals of Africa
Striped Hyena	Mammals of Asia
Swayne's Hartebeest	Mammals of Africa
Takin	Mammals of Asia
Tapir	Messages from the Wilderness
Thomas' Uganda Kob	Mammals of Africa
Walrus	Sea Mammals
Wart Hog	Mammals of Africa
Water Buffalo	Mammals of Asia
Weddell Seal	Sea Mammals
White Rhinoceros	Mammals of Africa
Yellow-checked Gibbon	Mammals of Asia

=== Evolving Planet ===
Evolving Planet follows the evolution of life on Earth over 4 billion years. The exhibit showcases fossils of single-celled organisms, ancient Invertebrates, early fish, Permian synapsids, dinosaurs, extinct mammals, and early hominids. The Field Museum's non-mammalian synapsid collection consists of over 1100 catalogued specimens, including 46 holotypes. The collection of basal synapsids includes 29 holotypes of caseid, ophiacodontid, edaphosaurid, varanopid, and sphenacodontid species – approximately 88% of catalogued specimens.

Species represented in Evolving Planet	Type	Specimen Notes
Cardipeltis	agnathan	fossil skeleton
Drepanaspis	agnathan	fossil skeleton
Tiktaalik	sarcopterygian	fossil skeleton
Acheloma	temnospondyl	fossil skeleton
Bradysaurus	pareiasaur	fossil skeleton
Cacops	dissorophid temnospondyls	fossil skeleton
Captorhinus	captorhinid	fossil skeleton
Casea	pelycosaur synapsids	fossil skeleton
Dicynodont	anomodont therapsids	fossil skeleton
Edaphosaurus	edaphosaurid synapsid	fossil skeleton
Eryops	temnospondyl	fossil skeleton
Jonkeria	dinocephalians	fossil skull
Labidosaurus	anapsid reptile	fossil skeleton
Lycaenops	carnivorous therapsids	fossil skull
Ophiacodon	ophiacodontidae synapsid	fossil skeleton
Seymouria	primitive tetrapod	fossil skeleton
Diasparactus	diadectid reptiliomorph	fossil skeleton
Sphenacodon	synapsid	fossil skeleton
Varanops	varanopid synapsid	fossil skeleton
Anchiceratops	ceratopsid dinosaur	fossil skull
Apatosaurus	sauropod dinosaur	fossil skeleton
Allosaurus	theropod dinosaur	fossil skull
Archaeopteryx	theropod dinosaur	fossil skeleton
Brachiosaurus	sauropod dinosaur	Holotype in permanent collections, mounted cast/model outside 2000 - 2023
Buitreraptor	dromaeosaurid theropod dinosaur	fossil skeleton
Cryolophosaurus	theropod dinosaur	fossil skull
Daspletosaurus	theropod dinosaur	fossil skeleton
Deinonychus	dromaeosaurid theropod dinosaur	fossil skeleton
Herrerasaurus	herrerasauridae dinosaur	fossil skeleton
Lambeosaurus	hadrosaurid dinosaur	fossil skeleton
Maiasaura	hadrosaurid dinosaur	fossil skeleton
Majungasaurus	abelisaurid theropod dinosaur	fossil skull
Masiakasaurus	theropod dinosaurs	fossil skull
Parasaurolophus	saurolophine hadrosaurid dinosaurs	fossil skeleton
Protoceratops	ceratopsian dinosaur	fossil skeleton
Rapetosaurus	sauropod dinosaur	fossil skeleton
Stegosaurus	thyreophoran dinosaur	fossil skeleton
Triceratops	ceratopsid dinosaur	fossil skeleton
Tyrannosaurus rex	coelurosaurian theropod dinosaur	fossil skeleton
Arctodus	short-faced bear	fossil skeleton
Barylambda	pantodont	fossil skeleton
Basilosaurus	prehistoric cetacean	fossil skeleton, pelvis with hind limbs
Coryphodon	pantodont	fossil skeleton
Eobasileus	uintathere	fossil skull
Glyptodon	glyptodont	fossil skeleton
Mastodon	proboscidean	fossil skeleton
Megatherium	giant ground sloth	fossil skeleton
Paramylodon	giant ground sloth	fossil skeleton
Pronothrotherium	ground sloth	fossil skeleton
Rodhocetus	prehistoric cetacean	fossil skeleton, pelvis with hind limb
Smilodon	saber-toothed cat	fossil skeleton
Thylacosmilus	saber-toothed metatherian	fossil skull
Ursus spelaeus	cave bear	fossil skeleton
Woolly Mammoth	proboscidean	fossil skeleton

=== Inside Ancient Egypt ===
Inside Ancient Egypt offers a glimpse into what life was like for ancient Egyptians. Twenty-three human mummies are on display as well as many mummified animals. The exhibit features a three-story replica (featuring two authentic rooms with 5,000-year-old hieroglyphs) of the mastaba tomb of Unas-Ankh, the son of Unas (the last pharaoh of the Fifth Dynasty). Also displayed are an ancient marketplace showing artifacts of everyday life, a shrine to the cat goddess Bastet, and dioramas showing the afterlife preparation process for the dead.

In 2024 the museum performed CT scans on 26 of their mummies.

=== The Ancient Americas ===
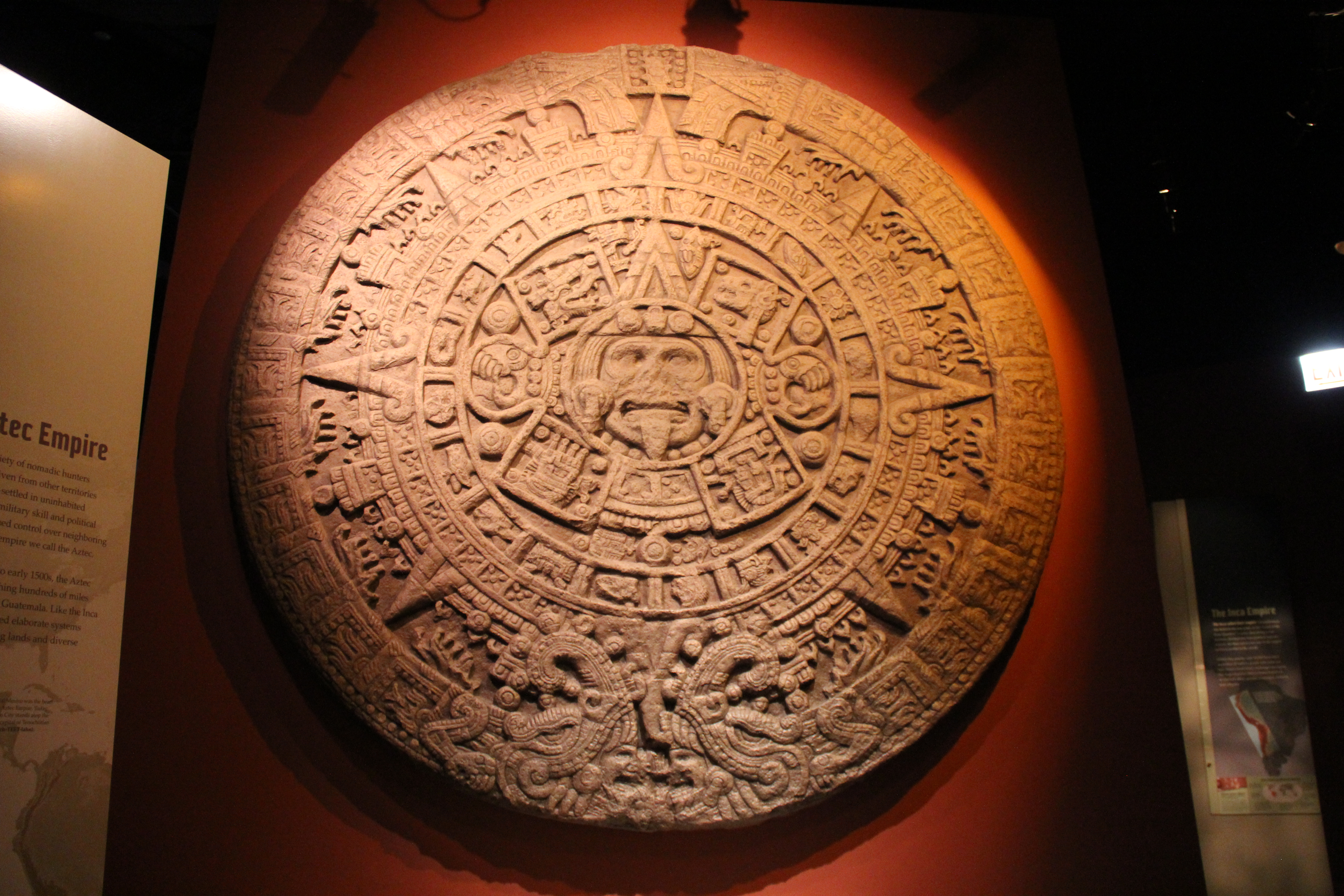
This replica of an Aztec sun stone is displayed in the Ancient Americas exhibit. It depicts the Aztec creation myth.

The Ancient Americas displays 13,000 years of human ingenuity and achievement in the Western Hemisphere, where hundreds of diverse societies thrived long before the arrival of Europeans. In this large permanent exhibition visitors can learn the epic story of the peopling of these continents, from the Arctic to the tip of South America. The exhibit consists of six displays: Ice Age Hunters, Innovative Hunters and Gatherers, Farming Villagers, Powerful Leaders, Rulers and Citizens, and Empire Builders. Visitors are encouraged to begin with Ice Age Hunters and conclude with Empire Builders. In this way, visitors can understand the cultural and economic progression of the Ancient Americas. Throughout the exhibit, collections are displayed in a way that emphasizes the cultural context of the artifacts.

The six displays draw from the Field Museum's massive North America collection. Significant collections utilized by the exhibit include pre-Columbian artifacts gathered by Mayanists Edward H. Thompson and John E. S. Thompson. Additionally, former curator Paul Sidney Martin's American Southwest collection makes up a significant portion of the "Farming Villagers" display. The Empire Builders display includes Aztec and Incan artifacts gathered in the 19th century.

The Ancient Americas exhibit transitions to the Alsdorf Hall of Northwest Coast and Arctic Peoples and eventually the Native Truths: Our Voices, Our Stories exhibit. This emphasizes the thematic unity of the Field Museum's American collections.

=== Cultural Halls ===
Cultural exhibitions include sections on Tibet and China, where visitors can view traditional clothing. There is also an exhibit on life in Africa, where visitors can learn about the many different cultures on the continent, and an exhibit where visitors may "visit" several Pacific Islands. The museum houses an authentic 19th-century Māori Meeting House, Ruatepupuke II, from Tokomaru Bay, New Zealand. Additionally, the Field Museum's Northwest Coast Collections showcase the early work of Franz Boas and Frederic Ward Putnam's work with the Kwakwakaʼwakw (Kwakiutl) people in the Alsdorf Hall of Northwest Coast and Arctic Peoples. Finally, the Native Truths: Our Voices, Our Stories permanent exhibition displays the Field Museum's current collaborative efforts with the indigenous people of North America.

==== Africa ====
The Africa cultural hall opened at the Field Museum in November 1993. It offers 14 different displays that are primarily ethnographic in nature. Several African countries are exhibited as well as a variety of geographical areas including the Sahara and East African rift valley. The final section is dedicated to the African diaspora with a particular focus on the impact of the slave trade on the continent. The Africa permanent exhibit owes most of its collection to the efforts of Wilfred D. Hambly. In October 2026, the museum announced a joint redevelopment of the Africa and ancient Egypt galleries covering 20,000 square feet (1,900 m^{2}). The new galleries are scheduled to open in spring 2028.

==== Peoples of the Arctic and Pacific Northwest ====
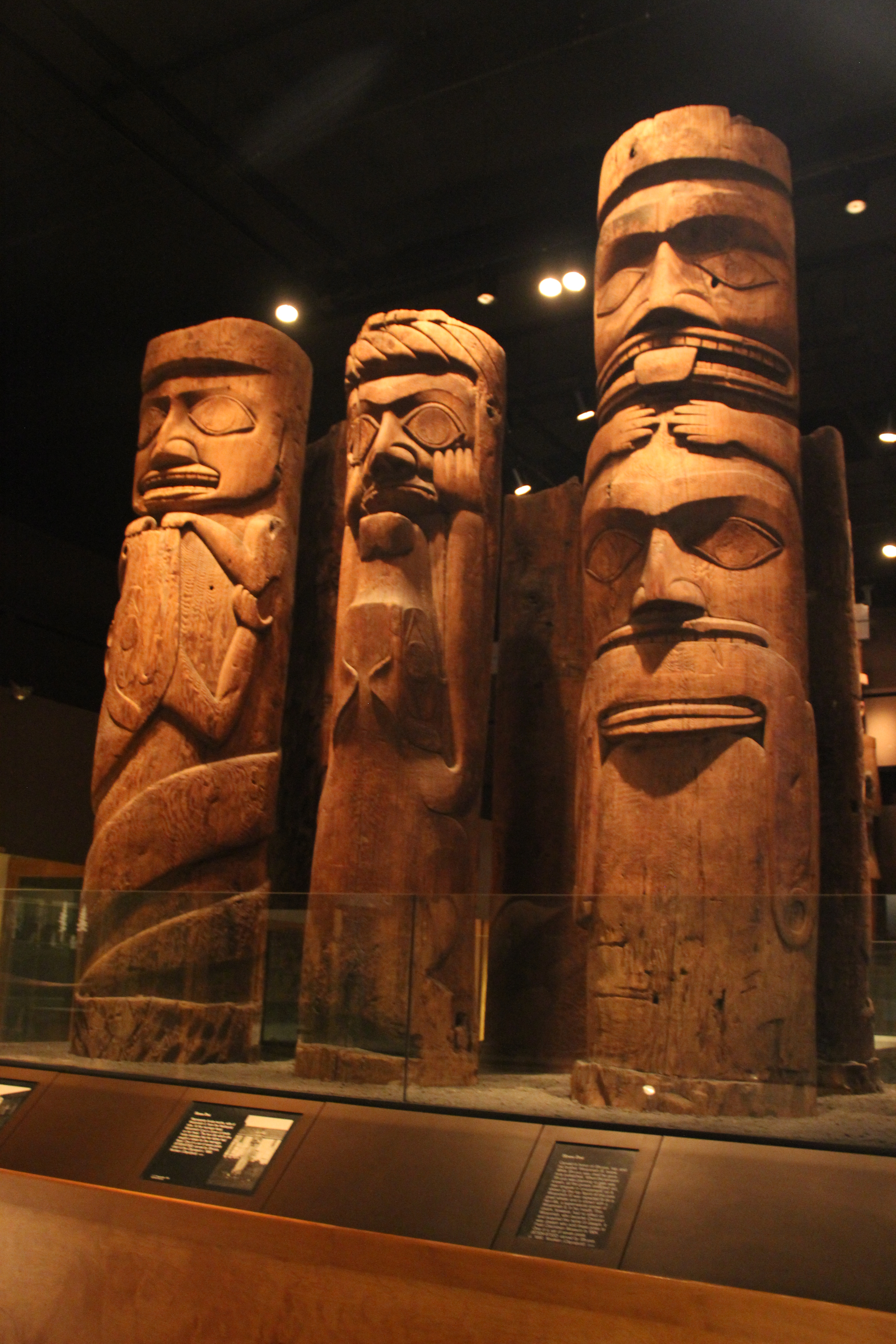
Pacific Northwest totem poles

This extensive permanent exhibition covers two culture areas that were vitally important to the early work of the Field Museum—the Arctic and Pacific Northwest. The Pacific Northwest collection is more extensive, but both collections are organized into four categories: subsistence, village and society, the spiritual world, and art. Major displays include a variety of dioramas and a large collection of totem poles. The current permanent exhibition has its origins in the Maritime Peoples hall created by the Field Museum's curator of North American archaeology and ethnology James VanStone.

==== Cyrus Tang Hall of China ====
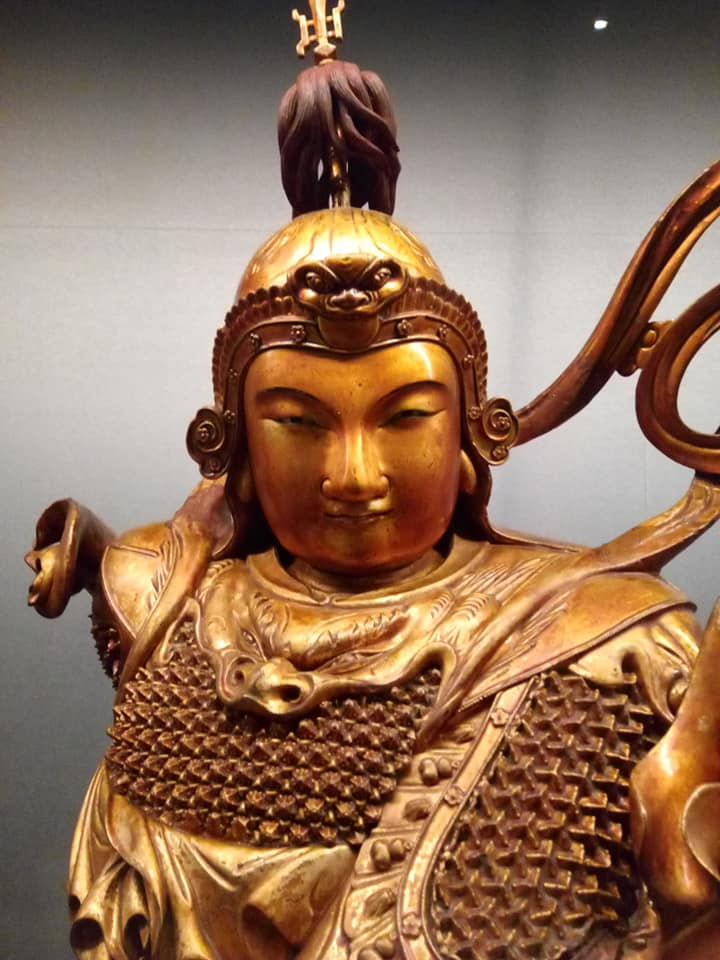
This statue of the divine protector Wei Tuo is one of many artifacts on display at the Cyrus Tang Hall of China at the Field Museum of Natural History.

The Cyrus Tang Hall of China opened as a permanent exhibition in 2015. The hall consists of five sections: Diverse Landscapes, Ritual and Power, Shifting Power, Beliefs and Practices, and Crossing Boundaries. The first three sections are organized chronologically while the final two sections are organized by theme. Three hundred and fifty objects are displayed throughout the five galleries. These artifacts are a sample chosen from the Field Museum's significant China collection. This collection was gathered by the sinologist Berthold Laufer.

==== Native Truths: Our Voices, Our Stories ====
Native Truths: Our Voices, Our Stories opened as a permanent exhibition in 2021. This exhibit is an extensive renovation of the former Native American Hall at the Field Museum. Native Truths utilizes about 400 artifacts to interpret Native American culture and history while also addressing modern-day challenges. The exhibition is a result of a changing attitude towards Native Americans that emphasized Native peoples instead of Native artifacts.

==== Regenstein Halls of the Pacific ====
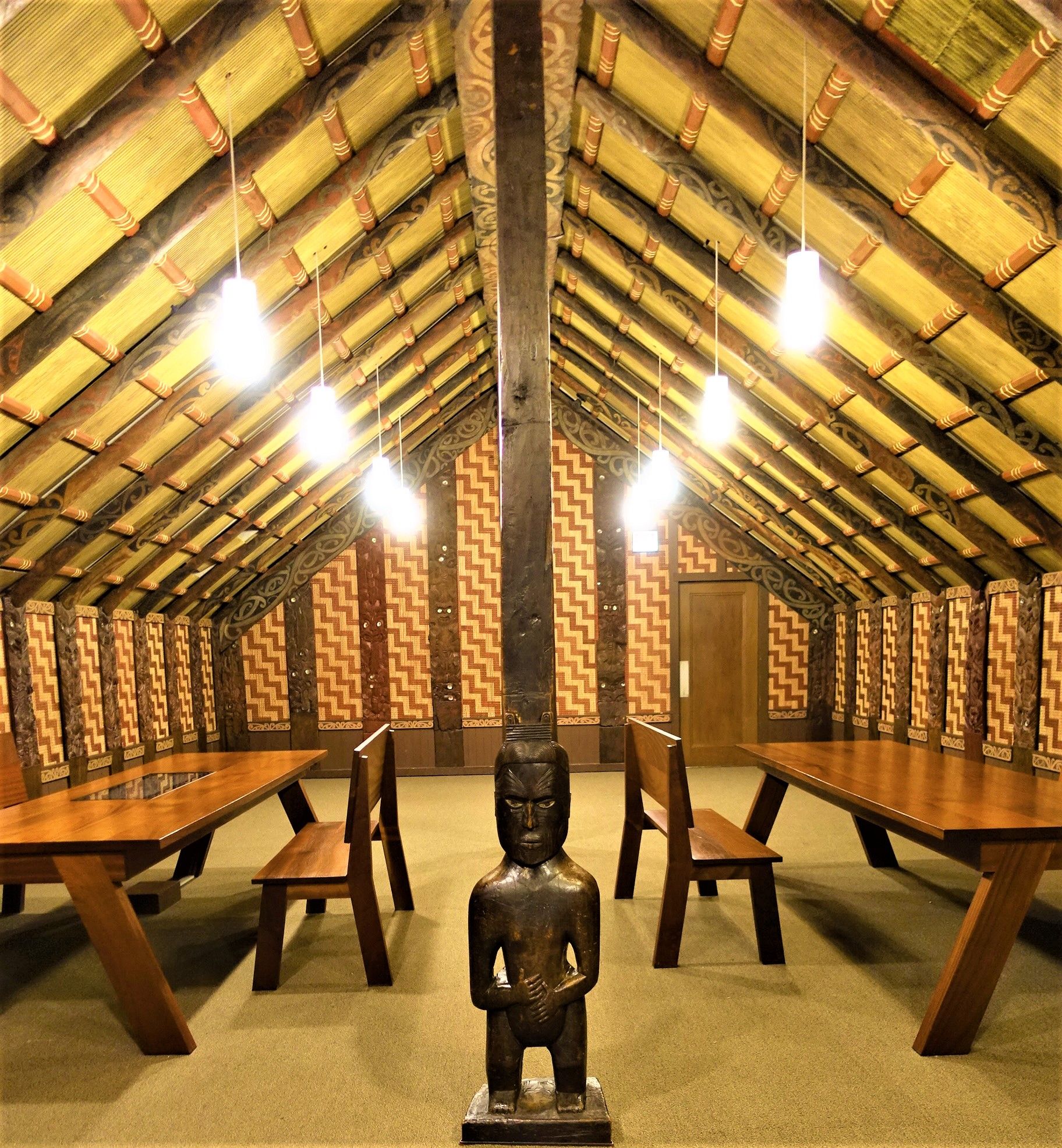
This authentic Maori Meeting House is displayed in the Field Museum's Regenstein Halls of the Pacific.

This exhibit is dedicated to the natural and cultural history of the Pacific Islands and is organized into five different sections: the natural history of the islands, the cultural origins of Pacific Islanders, a canoe display, an ethnographic collection showcasing New Guinea's Huon Gulf, and a modern Tahitian market. The final portion of the exhibit is dedicated to the ceremonial arts of the Pacific peoples. The majority of the collection was gathered by curator Albert Buell Lewis. Building upon Lewis' desire to portray cultures as living and participative, the exhibit was intentionally designed to demonstrate how the Pacific Islands interact with the contemporary world.

=== Geology halls ===
The Grainger Hall of Gems consists of a large collection of diamonds and gems from around the world, and also includes a Louis Comfort Tiffany stained glass window. The Hall of Jades focuses on Chinese jade artifacts spanning 8,000 years. The Robert A. Pritzker Center for Meteoritics and Polar Studies contains a large collection of fossil meteorites.

=== Underground Adventure ===
The Underground Adventure gives visitors a bug's-eye look at the world beneath their feet. Visitors can see what insects and soil look like from that size, while learning about the biodiversity of soil and the importance of healthy soil.

=== Working laboratories ===
- DNA Discovery Center – Visitors can watch real scientists extract DNA from a variety of organisms. Museum goers can also speak to a live scientist through the glass every day and ask them any questions about DNA.
- McDonald's Fossil Prep Lab – The public can watch as paleontologists prepare real fossils for study.
- The Regenstein Pacific Conservation Laboratory – 1,600-square-foot (150 m^{2}) conservation and collections facility. Visitors can watch as conservators work to preserve and study anthropological specimens from all over the world.

=== Sue, the Tyrannosaurus rex ===
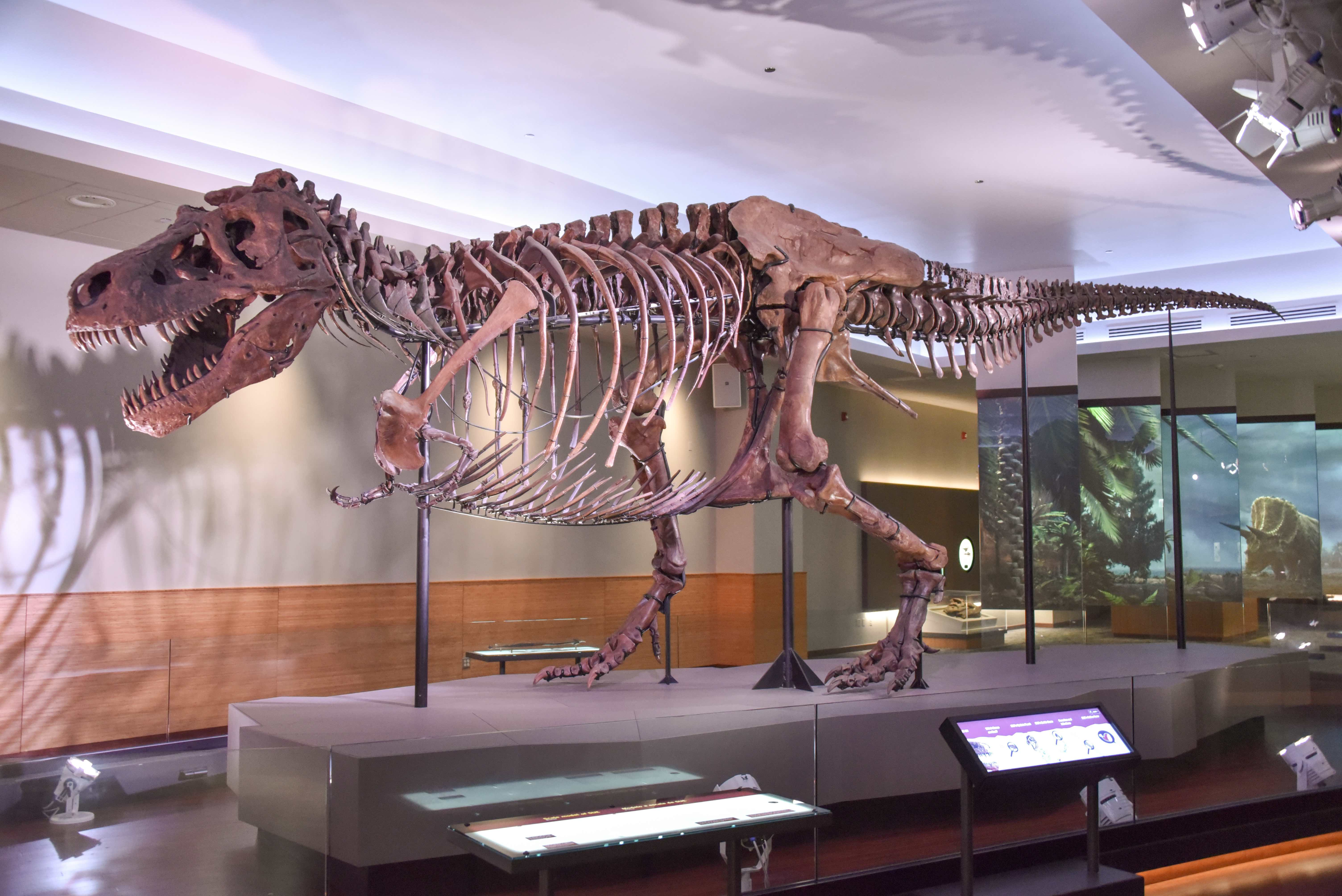
Sue, the largest and most complete (90%) Tyrannosaurus rex skeleton yet discovered

On May 17, 2000, the Field Museum unveiled Sue, the largest T. rex specimen discovered at the time. Sue has a length of 40.5 feet (12.3 m), stands 13 feet (4.0 m) tall at the hips, and has been estimated at 8.4–14 metric tons (9.26–15.4 short tons) as of 2018. The specimen is estimated to be 67 million years old. The fossil was named after the person who discovered it, Sue Hendrickson, and is commonly referred to as female, although the dinosaur's actual sex is unknown. The original skull is not mounted to the body due to the difficulties in examining the specimen 13 feet off the ground, and for nominal aesthetic reasons (the replica does not require a steel support under the mandible). An examination of the bones revealed that Sue died at age 28, a record for the fossilized remains of a T. rex until Trix was found in 2013. In December 2018 after revisions of the skeletal assembly were made to reflect new concepts of Sue's structure, display of the skeleton was moved into a new suite in The Griffin Halls of Evolving Planet.

== Temporary exhibitions ==
=== Fantastic Bug Encounters!* ===
TBA

=== Bloodsuckers: Legends to Leeches* ===
TBA

=== Unseen Oceans* ===
TBA

=== Reptiles Alive!* ===
TBA

- Includes live animals.

== Scientific collections ==
Professionally managed and maintained specimen and artifact collections, such as those at the Field Museum of Natural History, are a major research resource for the national and international scientific community, supporting extensive research that tracks environmental changes, benefits homeland security, public health and safety, and serves taxonomy and systematics research. Many of Field Museum's collections rank among the top ten collections in the world, e.g., the bird skin collection ranks fourth worldwide; the mollusk collection is among the five largest in North America; the fish collection is ranked among the largest in the world. The scientific collections of the Field Museum originate from the specimens and artifacts assembled between 1891 and 1893 for the World Columbian Exposition. Already at its founding, the Field Museum had a large anthropological collection.

A large number of the early natural history specimens were purchased from Ward's Natural History Establishment in Rochester, New York. An extensive acquisition program, including large expeditions conducted by the museum's curatorial staff resulted in substantial collection growth. During the first 50 years of the museum's existence, over 440 Field Museum expeditions acquired specimens from all parts of the world.

In addition, material was added through purchase, such as H. N. Patterson's herbarium in 1900, and the Strecker butterfly collection in 1908.

Extensive specimen material and artifacts were given to the museum by collectors and donors, such as the Boone collection of over 3,500 East Asian artifacts, consisting of books, prints and various objects. In addition, "orphaned collections" were and are taken in from other institutions such as universities that change their academic programs away from collections-based research. For example, already beginning in 1907, Field Museum accepted substantial botanical specimen collections from universities such as University of Chicago, Northwestern University and University of Illinois at Chicago, into its herbarium. These specimens are maintained and continuously available for researchers worldwide. The Index Herbariorum code assigned to this botanic garden is F and it is used when citing housed specimens. Targeted collecting in the US and abroad for research programs of the curatorial and collection staff continuously add high quality specimen material and artifacts; e.g., Dr. Robert Inger's collection of frogs from Borneo as part of his research into the ecology and biodiversity of the Indonesian fauna.

Collecting of specimens and acquisition of artifacts is nowadays subject to clearly spelled-out policies and standards, with the goal to acquire only materials and specimens for which the provenance can be established unambiguously. All collecting of biological specimens is subject to proper collecting and export permits; frequently, specimens are returned to their country of origin after study. Field Museum stands among the leading institutions developing such ethics standards and policies; Field Museum was an early adopter of voluntary repatriation practices of ethnological and archaeological artifacts.

=== Collection care and management ===
Field Museum collections are professionally managed by collection managers and conservators, who are skilled in preparation and preservation techniques. Numerous maintenance and collection management tools were and are being advanced at Field Museum. For example, Carl Akeley's development of taxidermy excellence produced the first natural-looking mammal and bird specimens for exhibition as well as for study. Field Museum curators developed standards and best practices for the care of collections. Conservators at the Field Museum have made notable contributions to conservation science with methods of preservation of artifacts including the use of pheromone trapping for control of webbing clothes moths.

The Field Museum was an early adopter of positive-pressure based approaches to control of environment in display cases, using control modules for humidity control in several galleries where room-level humidification was not practical. The museum has also adopted a low-energy approach to maintain low humidity to prevent corrosion in archaeological metals using ultra-well-sealed barrier film micro-environments. Other notable contributions include methods for dyeing Japanese papers to color match restorations in organic substrates, the removal of display mounts from historic objects, testing of collections for residual heavy metal pesticides, presence of early plastics in collections, the effect of sulfurous products in display cases, and the use of light tubes in display cases.

Concordant with research developments, new collection types, such as frozen tissue collections, requiring new collecting and preservation techniques are added to the existing holdings.

Despite the passage of the Native American Graves Protection and Repatriation Act in 1990, the Field Museum is estimated to hold more than 1000 Native American remains that have not been repatriated.

=== Collection records ===
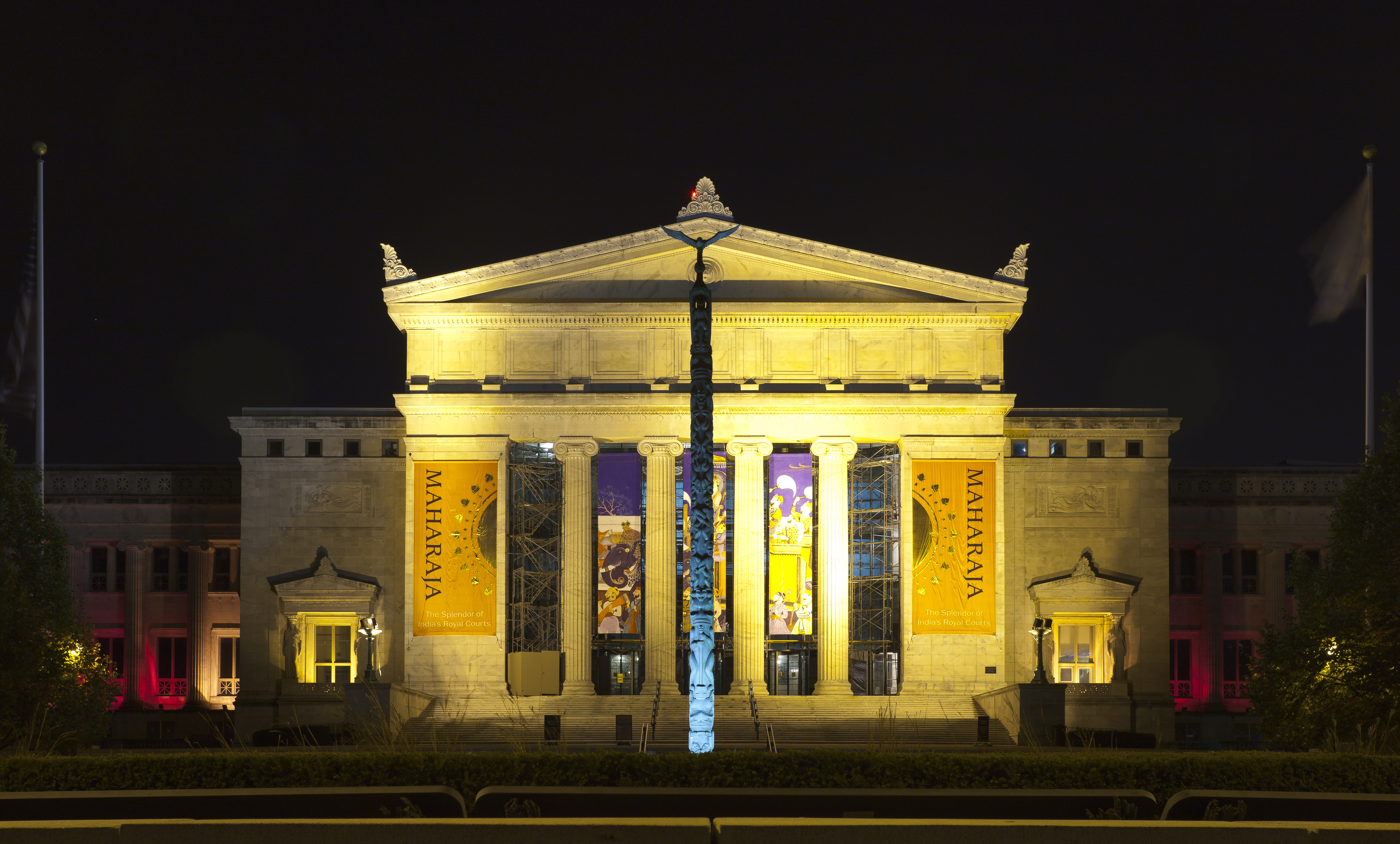
Night view of the north front exterior of the museum

Collection management requires meticulous record keeping. Handwritten ledgers captured specimen and artifact data in the past. Field Museum was an early adopter of computerization of collection data beginning in the late 1970s. Field Museum contributes its digitized collection data to a variety of online groups and platforms, such as: HerpNet, VertNet and Antweb, Global Biodiversity Information Facility (also known as GBif), and others. All Field Museum collection databases are unified and currently maintained in KE EMu software system. The research value of digitized specimen data and georeferenced locality data is widely acknowledged, enabling analyses of distribution shifts due to climate changes, land use changes and others.

=== Collection use ===
During the World's Columbian Exposition, all acquired specimens and objects were on display; the purpose of the World's Fair was exhibition of these materials. For example, just after opening of the Columbian Museum of Chicago, the mollusk collection occupied one entire exhibit hall, displaying 3,000 species of mollusks on about 1,260 square feet (117 m^{2}). By 1910, 20,000 shell specimens were on display, with an additional 15,000 "in storage".

Only a small fraction of the specimens and artifacts are publicly displayed. The vast majority of specimens and artifacts are used by a wide range of people in the museum and around the world. Field Museum curatorial faculty and their graduate students and postdoctoral trainees use the collections in their research and in training e.g., in formal high school and undergraduate training programs. Researchers from all over the world can search online for particular specimens and request to borrow them, which are shipped routinely under defined and published loan policies, to ensure that the specimens remain in good condition. For example, in 2012, Field Museum's Zoology collection processed 419 specimen loans, shipping over 42,000 specimens to researchers, per its Annual Report.

The collection specimens are an important cornerstone of research infrastructure in that each specimen can be re-examined and with the advancement of analytic techniques, new data can be gleaned from specimens that may have been collected more than 150 years ago.

== Library ==
The library at the Field Museum was organized in 1893 for the museum's scientific staff, visiting researchers, students, and members of the general public as a resource for research, exhibition development and educational programs. The 275,000 volumes of the Main Research Collections concentrate on biological systematics, environmental and evolutionary biology, anthropology, botany, geology, archaeology, museology and related subjects. The Field Museum Library includes the following collections:

=== Ayer collection ===
This private collection of Edward E. Ayer, the first president of the museum, contains virtually all the important works in the history of ornithology and is especially rich in color-illustrated works.

=== Laufer Collection ===
The working collection of Dr. Berthold Laufer, America's first sinologist and Curator of Anthropology until his death in 1934, consists of about 7,000 volumes in Chinese, Japanese, Tibetan, and numerous Western languages on anthropology, archaeology, religion, science, and travel.

=== Photo archives ===
The photo archives contain over 250,000 images in the areas of anthropology, botany, geology and zoology and documents the history and architecture of the museum, its exhibitions, staff and scientific expeditions. In 2008 two collections from the Photo Archives became available via the Illinois Digital Archives (IDA): The World's Columbian Exposition of 1893 and Urban Landscapes of Illinois. In April 2009, the Photo Archives became part of Flickr Commons.

=== Karl P. Schmidt Memorial Herpetological Library ===
The Karl P. Schmidt Memorial Herpetological Library, named for Karl Patterson Schmidt is a research library containing over 2,000 herpetological books and an extensive reprint collection.

=== John James Audubon's Birds of North America ===
The Field Museum's Double Elephant folio of Audubon's The Birds of America is one of only two known copies that were arranged in taxonomic order. Additionally, it contains all 13 composite plates. The Field's copy belonged to Audubon's family physician Dr. Benjamin Phillips.

== Education and research ==
The Field Museum offers opportunities for informal and more structured public learning. Exhibitions remain the primary means of informal education, but throughout its history the Museum has supplemented this approach with innovative educational programs. The Harris Loan Program, for example, begun in 1912, reaches out to children in Chicago area schools, offering artifacts, specimens, audiovisual materials, and activity kits. The Department of Education, begun in 1922, offers classes, lectures, field trips, museum overnights and special events for families, adults and children. The Field has adopted production of the YouTube channel The Brain Scoop, hiring its host Emily Graslie full-time as 'Chief Curiosity Correspondent'.

The Museum's curatorial and scientific staff in the departments of Anthropology, Botany, Geology, and Zoology conducts basic research in systematic biology and anthropology, besides its responsibility for collections management, and educational programs. It has long maintained close links, including joint teaching, students, seminars, with the University of Chicago and the University of Illinois at Chicago. Professional symposia and lectures, like the annual A. Watson Armour III Spring Symposium, present scientific results to the international scientific community and the public at large.

== Academic publication ==
The museum used to publish four peer-reviewed monograph series issued under the collective title Fieldiana, devoted to anthropology, botany, geology and zoology.

== See also ==
- Chicago Brachiosaurus replicas
- Captain Marshall Field Expeditions
- List of most-visited museums in the United States
- List of museums and cultural institutions in Chicago

== Bibliography ==
- Almazan, Tristan; Coleman, Sarah (2003). "George Amos Doresey: A Curator and His Comrades". Fieldiana. 36 (36): 87–97. JSTOR 29782672.
- Bronson, Bennet (2003). "Berthold Laufer". Fieldiana. 36 (36): 117–26. JSTOR 29782674.
- Codrington, Raymond (2003). "Wilfrid D. Hambly and Sub-Saharan Africa Research at the Field Museum, 1928–1953". Fieldiana. 36 (36): 153–163. JSTOR 29782677.
- Demissie, Fassil; Apter, Andrew (1995). "An Enchanting Darkness: A New Representation of Africa". American Anthropologist. 97 (3): 559–566. doi:10.1525/aa.1995.97.3.02a00140. JSTOR 683275.
- Hosmer, Brian (2008). "Untitled". The Public Historian. 30 (1): 142–45. doi:10.1525/tph.2008.30.1.142.
- Kaeppler, Adrienne (1991). "Untitled". American Anthropologist. 93 (1): 269–70. doi:10.1525/aa.1991.93.1.02a01100. JSTOR 681580.
- Kahn, Miriam (1995). "Heterotopic Dissonance in the Museum Representation of Pacific Island Cultures". American Anthropologist. 97 (2): 324–338. doi:10.1525/aa.1995.97.2.02a00100. JSTOR 681965.
- Kuta, Sarah (May 26, 2022). "Field Museum Confronts Its Outdated, Insensitive Native American Exhibition". Smithsonian Magazine.
- Lloyd, Timothy (2017). "The Cyrus Tang Hall of China: Deep Tradition, Dynamic Change". Museum Anthropology Review. 11 (1–2): 15–16. doi:10.14434/mar.v11i1.23543.
- Lupton, Carter; Rathburn, Robert (1984). "Maritime Peoples of the Arctic and Northwest Coast. A Permanent Exhibit at the Field Museum of Natural History". American Anthropologist. 86 (1): 229–230. doi:10.1525/aa.1984.86.1.02a00790.
- McVicker, Donald (2003). "A Tale of Two Thompsons: The Contributions of Edward H. Thompson and J. Eric S. Thompson to Anthropology at the Field Museum". Fieldiana. 36 (36): 139–152. JSTOR 29782676.
- Nash, Stephen (2003). "Paul Sidney Martin". Fieldiana. 36 (36): 165–177. JSTOR 29782678.
- Richter, Elizabeth (August 13, 2022). "Alaka Wali: Change Agent at the Field Museum". Classic Chicago Magazine.
- Welsch, Robert (2003). "Albert Buell Lewis: Realizing George Amos Dorsey's Vision". Fieldiana. 36 (36): 99–115. JSTOR 29782673.
- Yastrow, Ed; Nash, Stephen (2003). "Henry Field, Collections, and Exhibit Development, 1926–1941". Fieldiana. 36 (36): 127–138. JSTOR 29782675.
