= Amelia Trice =

Native American leader

Amelia "Amy" Cutsack Trice

Chairwoman of the Kootenai Tribal Council leader

Personal details
- Born: April 26, 1936 Bonners Ferry, Idaho
- Died: July 21, 2011 (aged 75) Spokane, Washington
- Spouse(s): Xavier Aitken, m. 1954; David Trice, m. 1969
- Children: Six children
- Known for: Idaho's Forgotten War, 1974

Amelia "Amy" Cutsack Trice (April 26, 1936 – July 21, 2011) was a Native American leader from Idaho.

Born in Bonners Ferry, Idaho, Trice was the chairwoman of the Kootenai Tribal Council. In 1974, while chairman, the Kootenai tribe declared war on the United States of America.

In the 1930s, the Kootenai Indians lived in tipis near Bonners Ferry, Idaho. Their allotment lands had been dissipated by the Bureau of Indian Affairs. A local physician managed to persuade the government to build eighteen houses. These had running water, but no bathing facilities, which were provided in a community center. By the 1970s nothing had changed. The Bureau of Indian Affairs asserted that the tribe had too small an enrollment to qualify for any assistance. Amy Trice decided to do something about it.

Declared on Sept. 20, 1974, the Kootenai War began when

... tribal members set up informational pickets and asked for 10-cent tolls on U.S. Highway 95 on the north and south sides of Bonners Ferry ... "The state police came with Mace and sawed-off shotguns," Trice said at the time. "The closest thing we had to a weapon in our tribal office was a fly swatter."

Trice had an ace in the hole. She said she was prepared to call the American Indian Movement for help, the same organization that had gotten into an armed standoff at Wounded Knee, S.D., a year earlier.

Within a few weeks, the tribe was able to get a concession and land grant from the federal government.

Trice was also known for her efforts to preserve traditional Kutenai culture and beliefs. She was fond of playing stick game, and took up water aerobics in her 60s. "She was a founding member of Upper Columbia United Tribes (UCUT), received the Women of Color Alliance Breaking Barriers for Women of Color in Idaho Award and the Chairman's Award from the Confederated Salish and Kootenai tribes."
