= Martin Langton Hallett =

Australian curator

- Born: 17 August 1945
- Died: 17 October 2019 (aged 74); Castlemaine, Victoria, Australia
- Occupation: Curator
- Years active: 1970–2018
- Known for: Melbourne Museum

Martin Langton Hallett (17 August 1945 - 17 October 2019) was a museum curator and deputy chief executive of Museums Victoria.

== Early life and education ==
Hallett was born in the Melbourne suburb of Frankston and spent much of his life there. His father, a flight lieutenant in World War II was reported missing in action, presumed dead just before Martin’s birth. He was educated at Frankston Primary School, and later at Dandenong High School, where he won commonwealth scholarships to attend the University of Melbourne to study agricultural science. He received a master’s in agriculture in 1970 and diploma of education at the University of Sydney in 1971. Moving to Papua New Guinea, he taught at Kwikila High School and then Goroka Teachers College, before returning to Melbourne prior to taking up a position at an agricultural college in Uganda in 1972-3.

He was married in 1969 to Sue Williams while at university. They had a daughter, Sarah, while in New Guinea, and another, Rebecca, in Uganda. He had two children with second wife Liza Dale.

== Museum career ==
In April 1975, as Uganda's political situation became problematic, Hallett was offered a position at the Science Museum of Victoria as curator of the rural science collection. Here he became an important contributor to Victoria’s contemporary museums through the development of physical and digital infrastructure.

He was an early adopter of digital technology in museum collection management and presentation and championed public access to cultural collections. In the 1970s he adapted computer technology for managing collection data, converting punched paper tape and Hollerith cards to digital formats. This transformed the Museum's records and collection management systems, contributing to the development of commercial software packages in the 1980s including the Texpress and KE Emu electronic cataloguing systems, which are now used by hundreds of cultural institutions worldwide, including the British Museum and the Smithsonian, and in the 1990s he led the project to develop Australia's first online museum database: Australian Museums and Galleries Online (AMOL).

In 1983 he took part in the successful merging of the Science Museum of Victoria and the National Museum to form the Museum of Victoria, and in 1989 he made important contributions to the development of Scienceworks at Spotswood. In the 1990s, he took a leading role in the development and construction of Melbourne Museum in the Carlton Gardens, particularly in the massive program to relocate the state collection of over 18 million artefacts.

Promoting the Victorian Sector: In 1980–82 Martin was President of the Victorian Branch of the Museums Association of Australia. During this time he helped organise Victoria’s first Museum of the Year Awards. The awards helped persuade Minister Norman Lacey to fund the Victorian Branch of the Museums Association of Australia, now Museums Australia (Victoria). This funding has assisted the Victorian Branch to become the most active in Australia.

Preserving Material Heritage: In the 1990s Martin championed the purchase and refitting of an industrial warehouse in Moreland to become an external storage repository for Museum Victoria’s collection. The solution proved to be remarkably cost effective and allowed Museum staff to access items that had been inaccessible, sometimes for over a century. Martin continued to champion strategic storage solutions and facilitated the State Government’s purchase of land in Spotswood for a solution across several State Collections. A Feasibility Study for development of the site will commence shortly.

in 2001, when the Museum Director George MacDonald left Hallett took over as Acting CEO until a new Chief Executive Officer was appointed as Deputy Chief Executive Officer and Director Regional Services overseeing the Immigration Museum, the Division of Outreach, Technology and Information Services and Multimedia.

Hallett was subsequently moved from the Museum Victoria, to become a senior arts officer for Creative Victoria, establishing the Culture Victoria and Victorian Collections websites, which provided public access to over 200 stories and 600,000 collection objects from 52 museums.

== Awards ==
Hallett was awarded the Commonwealth Public Service Medal in 2016 for 'outstanding contributions to improving the understanding and protection of cultural heritage in Victoria'. He was presented with the Museums Australia (Victoria) individual award for lifetime achievement in 2016.

Martin died of motor neurone disease in Castlemaine in 2019, aged 74.
