= Edward E. Ayer =

American businessman and bibliophile (1841-1927)

Edward Everett Ayer
- Born: November 16, 1841; Southport, Wisconsin Territory, U.S.
- Died: May 3, 1927 (aged 85); Chicago, Illinois, U.S.
- Occupations: Businessman, bibliophile
- Years active: 1860s–1920s
- Employer(s): Ayer & Lord Tie Company
- Known for: Founding benefactor of the Newberry Library and Field Museum of Natural History
- Notable work: Ayer Collection at the Newberry Library
- Relatives: Elbridge Ayer Burbank (nephew)

Edward Everett Ayer (November 16, 1841 – May 3, 1927) was an American business magnate, best remembered for the endowments of his substantial collections of books and original manuscripts concerning Native American and colonial-era history and ethnology - as well as a large collection of native objects - which were donated to the Newberry Library and Field Museum of Natural History in Chicago. Ayer had over time built up an immense fortune out of supplying timber to the 19th century's fast-growing railroad industry. However, it was a chance encounter in his youth with a book that inspired Ayer's lifelong investments of time and money that resulted in one of the largest collections of historical and American literature accumulated by the early 20th century. That book was William H. Prescott's famous History of the Conquest of Mexico, which Ayer first read in a small library attached to a silver mine south of Tucson Ayer had been guarding as part of his military service. By his own account, he was indelibly marked by what he read and it became the foundation for his insatiable interest in Indian Americana literature.

Notably, Edward Ayer commissioned his nephew Elbridge Ayer Burbank to travel to Fort Sill, Oklahoma to paint a portrait of Geronimo.

== Early life ==
Until 1836, the Ayer family had remained in Massachusetts since arriving from England two hundred years earlier. Like the colonizers who first came to the New World, Edward's father Elbridge Gerry Ayer was drawn to the adventure and economic possibilities on the frontier, and moved to Southport (modern-day Kenosha, Wisconsin) where Edward was born in 1841. His older sister Mary was possibly "the first white child born" there. A military road established by Congress turned Southport into an increasingly significant trade route. Ayer's father opened a general store, contracted a blacksmith, and even dabbled in grain brokering. He sold his enterprise to buy land five miles south where a train station was to be built. There he had the fortune to participate in the planning of the town of Harvard, Illinois. His efforts led to limited railroad construction contracts. Young Edward was educated at the first school built in Harvard, where he recalls "books were very scarce ... I virtually never saw any but the Bible and Josephus' works."

In 1860 at the age of nineteen, Ayer headed west to Silver City, Nevada, where he found employment at a quartz mine. With money saved from this hard labour Ayer was able to move to San Francisco, where he stayed with family friends and got a job at a saw mill, gaining his first experiences in the industry which would later make his fortune.

As California entered the American Civil War Ayer enlisted in the First California Cavalry Volunteers in August 1861, spending several years in the American southwest on military service. During this time, Ayer was stationed guarding the Cerro Colorado silver mine near the Mexican border. The mine had been supplied with a small library by its owners (donated by Colonel Samuel Colt, of Colt revolver fame), and it was here that Ayer came across a volume of Prescott's History of the Conquest of Mexico. At roughly twenty years old, this was the first library Ayer had ever seen, and upon reading Conquest of Mexico he describes the experience as one that "seemed to open up an absolutely new world to me".

Ayer returned to Harvard, Illinois at the conclusion of his service in 1864, where he received a third share in his father's general store. Within a month, Ayer was in Chicago on business where he happened past a bookseller and negotiated to purchase Prescott's full five-volume set on the conquests of Mexico and Peru. He recalls that day in his memoir:

I feel that that day, taking those books home, was, perhaps, the happiest day of my life up to that time; and going home I only touched the earth in high places. And I want to reiterate that the finding of Prescott's Conquest of Mexico in that mine in Arizona in '62, has been responsible and is to be credited as the principal force that has given me a vast amount of enjoyment in this world, and is absolutely responsible for the "Ayer Collection" in the Newberry Library, Chicago.

Ayer's nephew was the noted artist Elbridge Ayer Burbank, most renowned for his many paintings of Native American personages.

== Book and manuscript collections ==
Edward Ayer went on to amass an enormous collection of books and manuscripts on American history as it pertained to the North American Indian (inclusive of Central America). Ayer was a charter Trustee of Chicago's Newberry Library when it incorporated in 1892. In 1897, he determined to donate his roughly 50,000 pieces to the library, but because of the enormity of the undertaking, this took until 1911 to complete. As of 1941, three major holographs have been discovered in the collection: Bernardino de Sahagún's Latin-Spanish-Nahua dictionary, Father Junípero Serra's 1769 diary, and Father Francisco Ximénez' bicolumnar transcription-translation of the K'iche' Maya oral tradition (today known as Popol Vuh.).

Ayer was also an early benefactor of the Field Museum of Natural History (FMNH), instrumental in its foundation and serving as its first president. The FMNH arose from the collections assembled for the World's Columbian Exposition in 1893, as the curator in charge of the collections F.W. Putnam sought to establish a permanent exhibition of the materials. As one of the museum's incorporators, Ayer set to work establishing an endowment fund, and approached the retail magnate Marshall Field (after whom the museum was later named) for contributions. Field was initially reluctant, reportedly declaring "I don't know anything about a museum, and I don't care to know anything about a museum". However Ayer was eventually able to persuade Field to relent, supposedly through admonishing Field with "You can sell dry goods until hell freezes over, but in 25 years, you will be absolutely forgotten." Field contributed one million dollars towards the establishment, and a further eight million was bequeathed to the museum from Field's estate upon his death.

Ayer himself led in the expansion of the museum's library, in 1894 donating 400 of his own volumes on ornithology and a further 600 he had bought from the collection of Charles Cory. Ayer continued to expand to the museum library holdings with further purchases of natural history collections in ichthyology and other topics, and donations from his own acquisitions. By 1926 in the year before his death the Ayer Collection at FMNH was one of the most extensive and foremost of its type in the world.
