= Elbridge Gerry (disambiguation) =

Elbridge Gerry (1744–1814) was an American Founding Father, merchant, politician and diplomat who served as the fifth vice president. The political practice of gerrymandering is named after him.

Elbridge Gerry may also refer to:

- Elbridge Gerry (Maine politician) (1813–1886), U.S. Representative from Maine
- Elbridge Thomas Gerry (1837–1927), American lawyer and reformer
- Elbridge T. Gerry Sr. (Elbridge Thomas Gerry, 1908–1999), banker and polo player
- Elbridge T. Gerry (pilot boat), New York Sandy Hook pilot boat built in 1888

== See also ==
- Elbridge Gerry Lapham (1814–1890), U.S. Senator from New York
- Elbridge Gerry Spaulding (1809–1897), U.S. Representative from New York
- Elbridge Gerry House
- Elbridge T. Gerry Mansion
