= Upper Columbia United Tribes =

Upper Columbia United Tribes includes the Spokane, Coeur d'Alene, Kalispel, Colville Confederated, Lakes-Okanogan tribes in Washington, Idaho and Montana, United States.

One of the founding members was Amelia Trice, chairwoman of the Kootenai Tribal Council

Mary Verner, former mayor of Spokane, Washington has served as executive director.

The tribes have adopted Drumheller Springs Historic Park in Spokane, Washington, a traditional campground which was the site of the first school in the Oregon Territory, established by Chief Spokane Garry in 1830."
