= KE Software =

Software company based in UK

Coordinates: 53°28′26.6″N 2°14′39.8″W

- Industry: computer software
- Founded: 1970s
- Successor: The Axiell Group (2014)
- Headquarters: Manchester, United Kingdom
- Products: Ke EMu Electronic Museum management system; Vitalware Vital Records Management System

KE Software is a formerly Australian-owned computer software company based in Manchester, United Kingdom, which specialises in collection management programs for museums, galleries and archives. The Axiell Group acquired the firm in 2014.

== History ==
KE Software had its origins in investigations into electronic systems for managing natural science collections conducted in the late 1970s under a joint program of the University of Melbourne, the then National Museum of Victoria and the Australian Museum, which led to the development of the Titan Database in 1984. Much of the credit for the development of the project was due to the work of Martin Hallett of the Museum of Victoria which evolved into Textpress, and by 2000, the KE EMu database program. KE Software was bought by Axiell in 2014 and the team merged with the Axiell staff. Axiell continues to sell and support EMu.

== Products ==
The firm has two main products: the Ke EMu Electronic Museum management system, a collections management system for museums; and Vitalware Vital Records Management System. The first version of Ke EMu was launched in 1997 and uses the Texpress database engine with client/server architecture on a Windows or Unix/Linux server. Ke Emu is consistent with the Dublin Core / Darwin Core standards for archive and museum catalogue metadata. "The company’s clients include the three largest museums in the world.:

== KE EMu ==
KE EMu is considered one of the more effective and purpose-designed museum cataloguing programs. particularly in the creation of public interfaces to museum catalogue data.

KE EMu was further developed in 1997 as a multilingual platform, which has been utilised in bilingual institutions such as the Canadian Museum of Civilisation. Subsequently this evolved into Texpress and KE EMu (standing for Electronic MUseum) in 2000, which is "now used across the world in natural science museums with huge collections'".

KE EMu is used by a large number of museums and galleries around the world, including the Smithsonian Anthropological Collection, American Museum of Natural HistoryVancouver Art Gallery, New York Botanical Garden, the University of Chicago Research Archives, the University of Pennsylvania Museum in Philadelphia, the National Museum of Australia, the Australian Museum, Museum of Victoria, University of Melbourne Archives, and the Alexander Turnbull Library, National Library of New Zealand.

There are over 300 clients, and more than 5000 users of the EMu software worldwide. The program has been described as providing "...comprehensive museum management (collection management plus other administrative needs for a museum), workflow and project management, flexible metadata, various stats and metrics, and comprehensive web interface with support for mobile devices and kiosks"

== KE Vitalware ==
The firm's vitalware software is used by a number of governments and commercial organisations for managing and accessing large data sets, such as the birth records of the Trinidad and Tobago Registrar General, the Government of Anguilla, Ministry for Infrastructure, Communications, Utility and Housing, and the Mississippi Department of Information Technology Services.

== Further development ==
A specialist tracking component for KE EMu has been developed by Forbes Hawkins of Museum Victoria. This enables locations to be barcoded, and data to be updated as items are moved around the stores, or between venues, display, laboratories and other locations. This system has been considered by Museums around the world. The company has been working with Australian government agencies to digitize birth deaths and marriage registers in order to cross match identity data. The program has also been used for managing the Australian Plant Disease Database and the Australian Plant Pest Database as the program "...has several features that have proven to be invaluable for a plant disease database".
