= Tejon Indian Tribe =

Native American tribe in California

Total population
- 734 enrolled members

Regions with significant populations
- United States (California)

Languages
- English

Religion
- Indigenous religion, Christianity

Related ethnic groups
- other Chumash, Kitanemuk, and Yokuts people

The Tejon Indian Tribe is a federally recognized tribe of Kitanemuk, Yokuts, Paiute and Chumash Indigenous people of California.

Their ancestral homeland is the southern San Joaquin Valley, San Emigdio Mountains, and Tehachapi Mountains. Today they live in Kern County, California.

== Government ==
The tribe's headquarters are located in Bakersfield, California. They are governed by a democratically–elected tribal council. As of 2016 their tribal chairperson is Octavio Escobedo III and their vice-chairwoman is June Nachor.

== History ==
The Sebastian Indian Reservation (1853–1864) was established in 1853 by Edward F. Beale on Rancho El Tejon lands, that became part of the Tejon Ranch. It was the first Indian reservation in California. At its establishment it was 763,000 acres (309,000 ha) but was reduced to 25,000 acres (10,000 ha). Two thousand Indians lived on the land. In 1863 Beale purchased Rancho El Tejon for his private use. One hundred Indians stayed on his lands when the reservation was dissolved. Many Indians were forcibly relocated at gunpoint to the new Tule River Reservation, which was established near Porterville in Tulare County.

Financially backed by Cannery Casino Resorts, the tribe received approval to acquire 320 acres (130 ha) of land in Mettler from the Department of the Interior along with the department's approval of the compact between the tribe and California that will govern class three gaming on the land.
