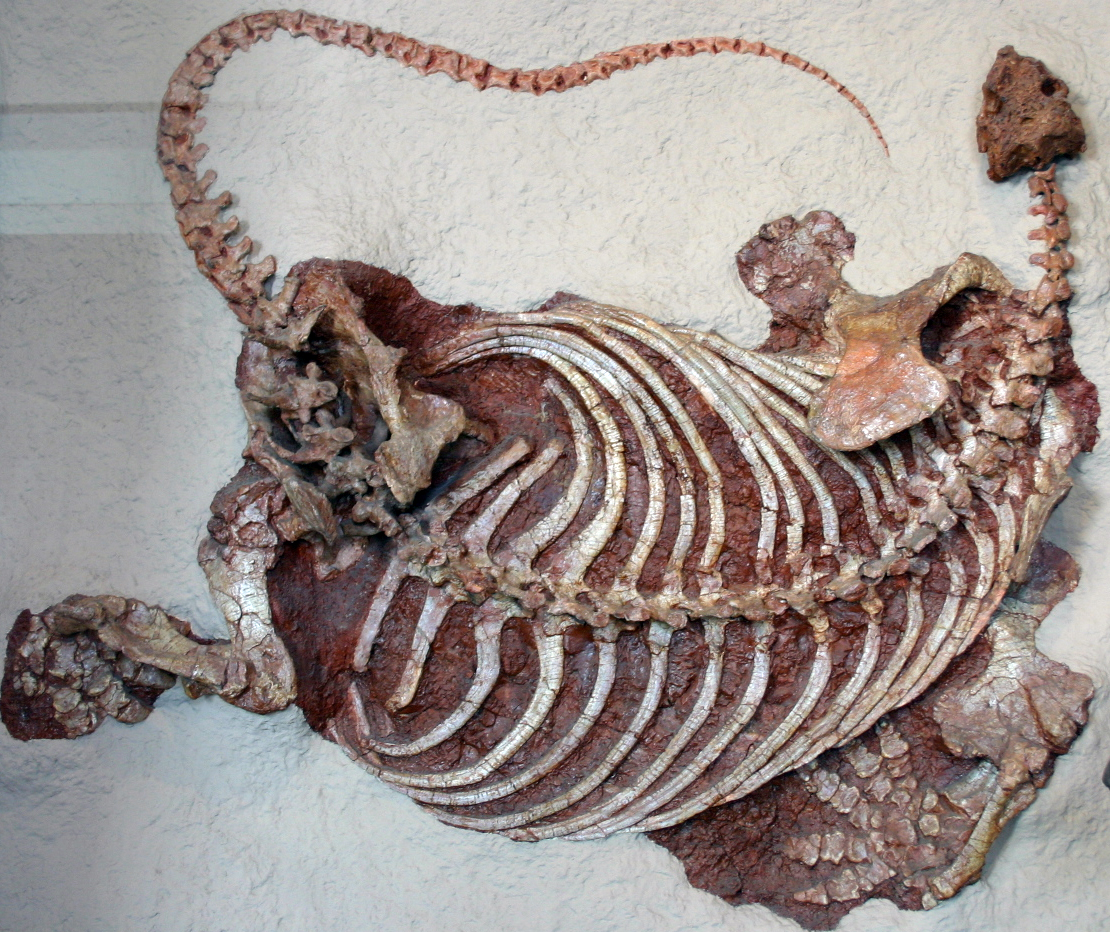
- Fossil skeleton of Cotylorhynchus romeri

Scientific classification
- Kingdom: Animalia
- Phylum: Chordata
- Clade: Synapsida
- Clade: †Caseasauria
- Family: †Caseidae; Williston, 1912

Genera
- Alierasaurus; Angelosaurus; Arisierpeton; Callibrachion; Casea; Caseoides; Caseopsis; Cotylorhynchus; Datheosaurus; Ennatosaurus; Eocasea; Euromycter; Lalieudorhynchus; Martensius; Oromycter; Phreatophasma; Ruthenosaurus; Trichasaurus

= Caseidae =

Caseidae Temporal range: Late Carboniferous - Middle Permian, 300–265 Ma

Extinct family of vertebrate animals

Caseidae are an extinct family of basal synapsids that lived from the Late Carboniferous to Middle Permian between about 300 and 265 million years ago. Fossils of these animals come from the south-central part of the United States (Texas, Oklahoma, and Kansas), and various parts of Europe (European Russia, France, Germany, Sardinia, and Poland), with a possible presence in Gondwana based on paleolatitude reconstructions. Caseids show great taxonomic and morphological diversity. The most basal taxa were small insectivorous and omnivorous forms that lived mainly in the Upper Carboniferous and Lower Permian, such as Eocasea, Callibrachion, and Martensius. This type of caseid persists until the middle Permian with Phreatophasma. During the early Permian, the clade is mainly represented by many species that adopted a herbivorous diet. Some have evolved into gigantic forms that can reach 6–7 metres (20–23 ft) in length, such as Cotylorhynchus hancocki and Alierasaurus ronchii, making them the largest Permian synapsids. Caseids are considered important components of early terrestrial ecosystems in vertebrate history because the numerous herbivorous species in this family are among the first terrestrial tetrapods to occupy the role of primary consumer. The caseids experienced a significant evolutionary radiation at the end of the early Permian, becoming, with the captorhinid eureptiles, the dominant herbivores of terrestrial ecosystems in place of the edaphosaurids and diadectids.

In 2016 and 2022, paleontologists proposed a semiaquatic lifestyle for the most derived genera like Cotylorhynchus and Lalieudorhynchus, but this hypothesis is disputed by other researchers.

With a fossil record spanning from the Late Carboniferous to the Middle Permian, caseids are one of the basal synapsids groups (formerly known as "pelycosaur") having the largest stratigraphic range. Despite suffering a notable decline during the late Early Permian, casedis also represent one of only two basal synapsid groups (the other being Varanopidae) to survive in therapsid-dominated terrestrial communities. Thus, the last known caseids come from the strata of the middle Permian (upper Roadian to lower Wordian) and (latest Wordian-earliest Capitanian) of France, where they cohabited notably with dinocephalians. (Note: Dinocephalians are known in France only by their footprints attributed to the ichnogenus Brontopus. The latter has also been found in the Abrahamskraal Formation in South Africa where skeletal remains of dinocephalians are abundant. In Russia, the caseid Ennatosaurus is present in the Mezen assemblage, which also includes an as yet undescribed species of anteosaurid dinocephalian.) These last caseids still show a certain morphological diversity with medium to large herbivores (Ennatosaurus and Lalieudorhynchus), as well as small predatory or omnivorous forms such as Phreatophasma. Caseids are so far unknown in Upper Permian strata and probably disappeared at the end of the Middle Permian. They were replaced by pareiasaurs (with similar dentition) and dicynodonts.

== Description ==
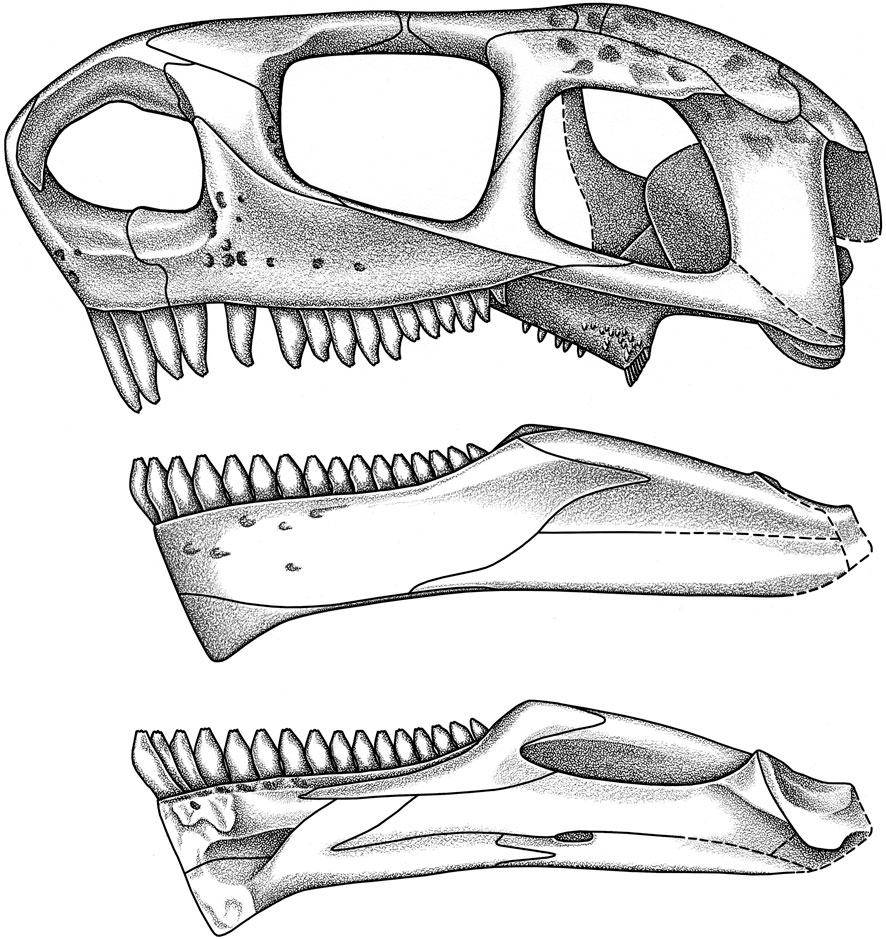
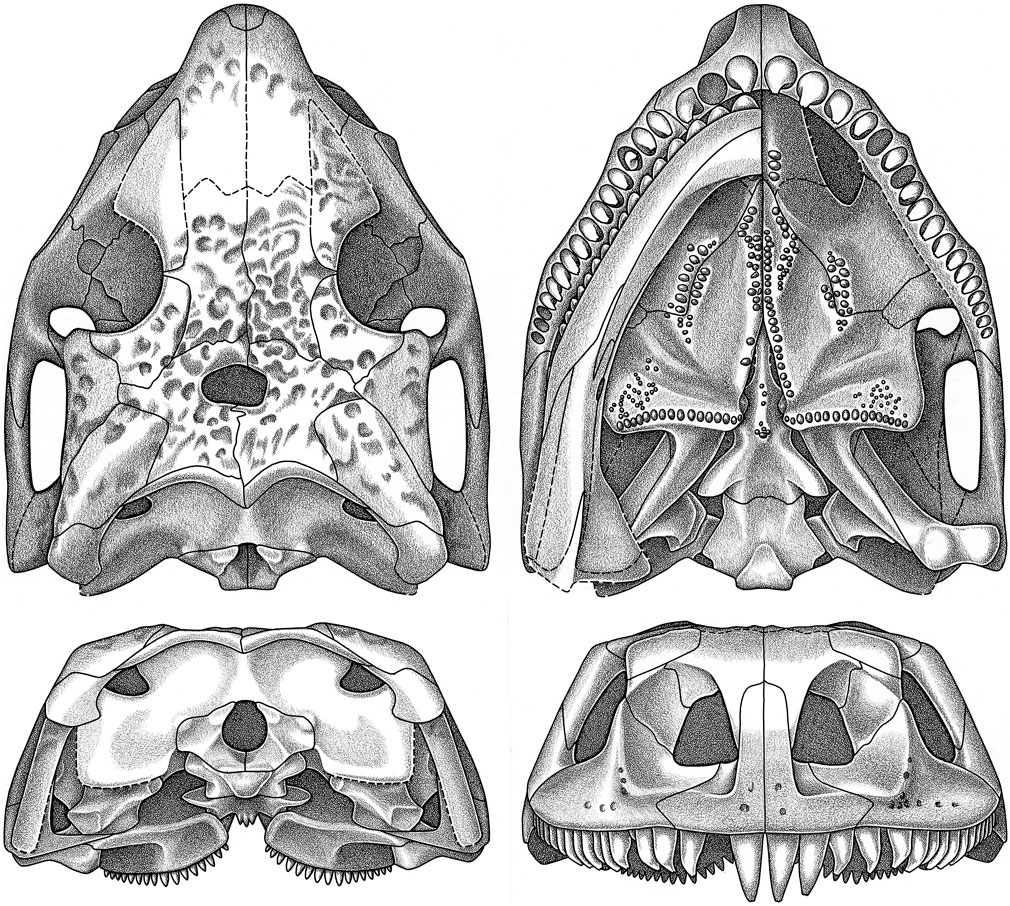
Cotylorhynchus romeri. Top : skull reconstruction in left lateral view, and medial and lateral views of mandible; bottom : skull reconstruction in dorsal, ventral, posterior and anterior views.

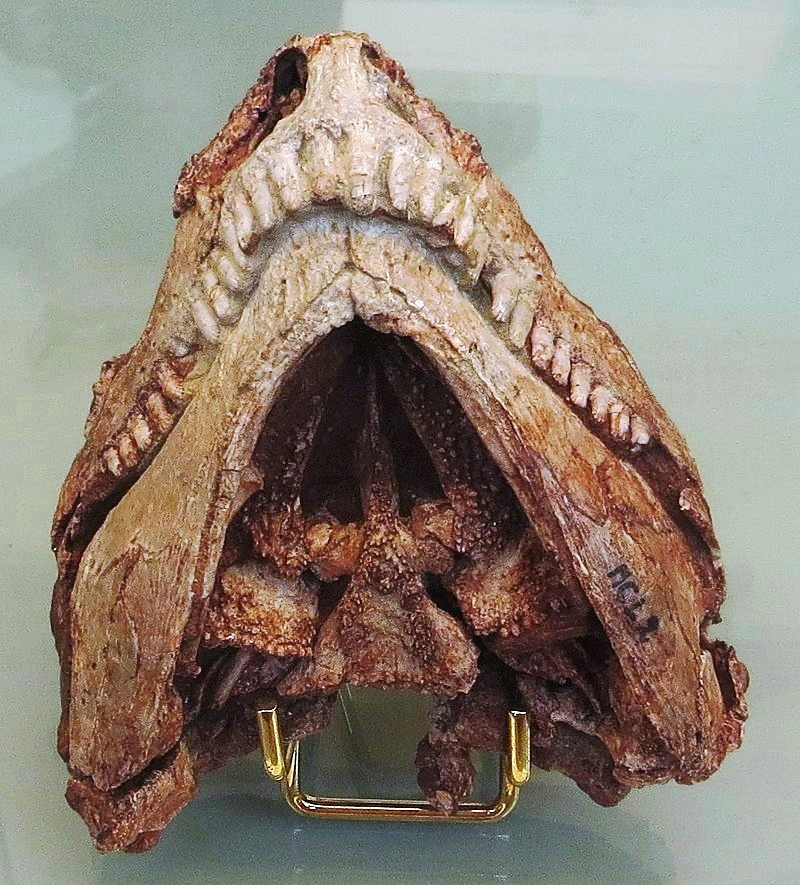
Skull of Euromycter rutenus in ventral view allowing to see the numerous small teeth adorning the bones of the palate (the parasphenoid, triangular in shape in the center, and the very elongated pterygoids on each side). The hyoid apparatus is not present here because it was removed during the preparation of the palate.

Size of Cotylorhynchus romeri compared to a human

Caseids measured from less than 1 metre (3 ft 3 in) to 7 metres (23 ft) in length. They had a small head wider than high and with a forward-inclined snout, a very short neck, a long tail, robust forelimbs, and a body of variable proportions depending on their diet. Small insectivorous species like Eocasea had an unexpanded trunk. Others with an omnivorous diet like Martensius had a barely enlarged rib cage, a more elongated skull, smaller nostrils, and a snout less inclined forward than in herbivorous caseids. The latter were characterized by their disproportionately small skull compared to the size of the body. The postcranial skeleton indeed shows a spectacular increase in the volume of the rib cage, which becomes very wide and barrel-shaped, probably to accommodate a particularly developed intestine, necessary for the digestion of high-fiber rich plants. In these forms, the skull has very large external nostrils and a very short facial region with a strong forward inclination of the end of the snout which clearly overhangs the dental row. The temporal fenestrae are also relatively large (especially in Ennatosaurus), the supratemporals are large in size, and, on the occipital surface, the paroccipital processes are massively developed, establishing strong supporting contacts with the squamosals.

The dorsal surface of the skull is covered with numerous small pits. These suggest the presence of large scales on the head of these animals. Numerous labial foramina running parallel to the ventral edge of the premaxilla and maxilla, as well as along the dorsal edge of the dentary, suggest the presence of scaly "lips" which must have concealed the dentition when the jaws were closed. The teeth, simply conical and pointed in insectivorous species, adopt in herbivorous species a leafy or spatulate morphology and are provided with more or less numerous cuspules. Numerous small teeth also adorned several bones of the palate. Herbivorous species do not show a simple evolutionary trend towards increasing tooth complexity. Thus, the teeth of the basal taxa Casea and Arisierpeton have three cuspules just like in the more derived forms Cotylorhynchus and Caseopsis. Ennatosaurus and Euromycter, which occupy an intermediate phylogenetic position, have teeth bearing 5 to 7 cuspules and 5 to 8 cuspules respectively.

Angelosaurus, one of the most derived caseids, has teeth with 5 cuspules. In Angelosaurus the teeth have a bulbous morphology with very short and wide crowns. Their sturdiness and the significant wear they show indicate that Angelosaurus must have fed on tougher plants than those on which most other herbivorous caseids fed. Herbivorous caseids also show very different dietary adaptations from those seen in another group of basal synapsids, the Edaphosauridae. The latter had, in addition to the marginal dentition, a dental battery made up of numerous teeth located both on the palate and on the inner surface of the lower jaws. In herbivorous caseids, the palatal teeth are smaller, and the inner surface of the lower jaws bears no teeth. Instead of a dental battery, they had a massive tongue (as indicated by the presence of a highly developed hyoid apparatus found in Ennatosaurus and Euromycter) perhaps rough, with which they had to compress food against the palatal teeth.

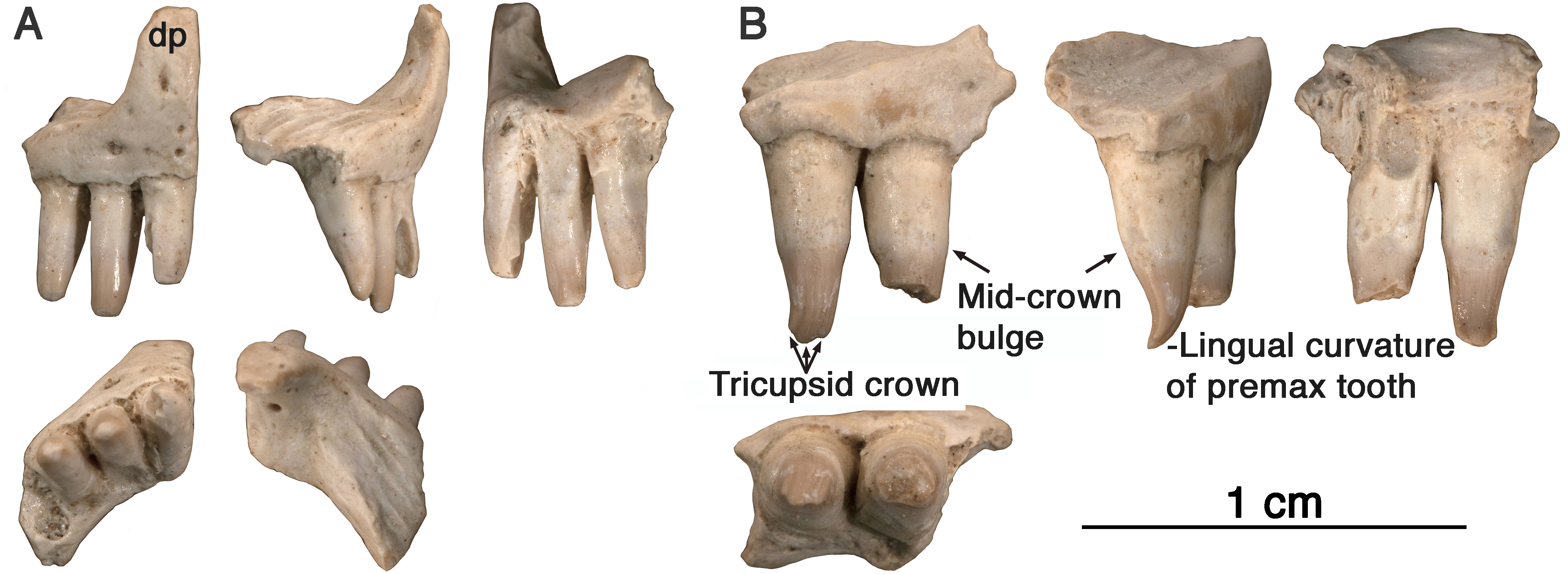
Premaxillae of Arisierpeton simplex. (A) Specimen GAA 00242 in anterior, labial, posterior, ventral, and dorsal views; (B) Specimen GAA 00239 in labial (showing a complete tooth with tricuspid distal end), partial labial, posterior and ventral views.

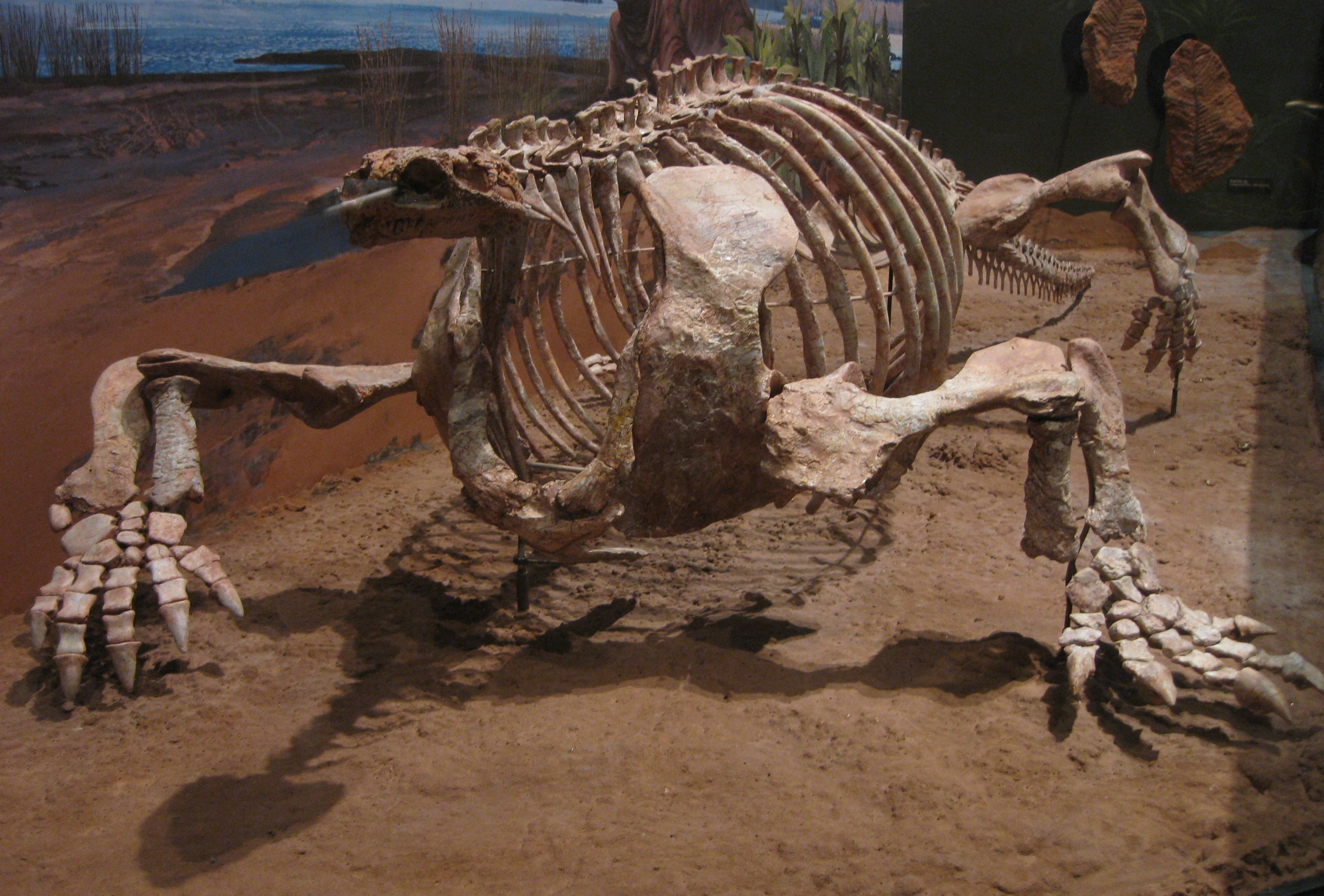
Skeleton of Cotylorhynchus romeri on display at the Sam Noble Oklahoma Museum of Natural History.

The forelimbs of caseids are often more robust than the hindlimbs. It has indeed been observed that the bones of the forelimbs gained in robustness from the beginning of the evolution of the group, before the appearance of large species, while the hindlimbs remained slenderer. These characteristics suggest that the initial strengthening of the forelimbs was probably related to a particular function such as digging, and that this trait was later exapted by more derived and larger caseids to support their weights of up to several hundred kilograms. During their evolutionary history, caseids also show a reduction in their phalangeal formula. (Note: The phalangeal formula corresponds to the number of phalanges constituting each digits of the manus and pes of tetrapods. It is listed starting from digit I (corresponding in men to the thumb and big toe) to digit V (the equivalent of the little finger and little toe).) The most basal caseids like Eoasea, Callibrachion, and Martensius possessed the plesiomorphic condition of early amniotes with a phalangeal formula of 2-3-4-5-3 for manus and 2-3-4-5-4 for pes. In Euromycter the manus has a formula of 2-3-4-4-3 (the pes is unknown). In the more derived forms like Cotylorhynchus the manus and pes show a phalangeal formula of 2-2-3-3-2. (Note: In 1962 Olson and Barghusen had reported in the species Cotylorhynchus bransoni a foot with the phalangeal formula of 2-2-2-3-2, i.e. a smaller formula than in the type species C. romeri. In 2015 Romano and Nicosia however demonstrated that the third digit of the foot of this species indeed had three phalanges and not two. Consequently the phalangeal formula of the foot of C. bransoni was 2-2-3-3-2 like C. romeri.) Along with this reduction in the number of phalanges, the proportions of the autopods also change in derived caseids with metacarpals, metatarsals, and phalanges becoming shorter and broader. At the extreme of this specialization the genus Angelosaurus has short, broad, and smooth ungual phalanges which resemble hooves rather than claws.

The bodies of caseids appear to have been covered in epidermal scales, similar to those of reptiles. They also appear to have possessed a cloacal opening at the base of the tail, as is ancestral for amniotes.

== Footprints ==
Many vertebrate tracks have been proposed as belonging to Caseidae. In the early 2000s, large footprints known as Brontopus giganteus from the Permian Lodève basin in southern France were considered to belong either to a caseid or dinocephalian therapsid. In 2019, Lorenzo Marchetti and colleagues, however, determined that dinocephalians were most likely the trackmakers of the ichnogenus Brontopus. In 2012, Rafael Costa da Silva and colleagues proposed that the ichnogenus Chelichnus, widely distributed in Permian desert facies (fossil dunes) of Europe, North America and South America, could represent caseids footprints. In 2019, Marchetti and colleagues, however, reinterpreted Chelichnus as a nomen dubium and a taphotaxon, this type of track showing false anatomical features generated by locomotion on sandy inclined paleosurface. In 2014, Eva Sacchi and colleagues described the ichnotaxon Dimetropus osageorum from about a hundred isolated footprints and several trackways from the early Permian Wellington Formation in Oklahoma. The morphological study of these footprints and their comparison with tetrapod skeletons revealed that they probably belong to a large caseid comparable in size to Cotylorhynchus romeri (the latter from more recent strata). According to Sacchi and colleagues, some footprints from the Lodève Basin (unspecified geological formation) are similar to those from the Wellington Formation and these authors designate them as Dimetropus cf. osageorum. The study by Sacchi et al. also demonstrates that the ichnogenus Dimetropus exhibits great morphological variation and that its producers can be assigned to different zoological groups among non-therapsid synapsids and not just Sphenacodontidae as once thought. In 2021, Rafel Matamales-Andreu and colleagues assigned footprints found in the Lower Permian (Artinskian-Kungurian) Port des Canonge Formation in Mallorca to a caseid. These footprints resemble those of D. osageorum but they also have differences. These footprints are left in open nomenclature as cf. Dimetropus sp.. They are, however, smaller than those of D. osageorum and would have been produced by a caseid of modest size with proportions comparable to Ennatosaurus.

== Paleobiology ==
=== Diets ===
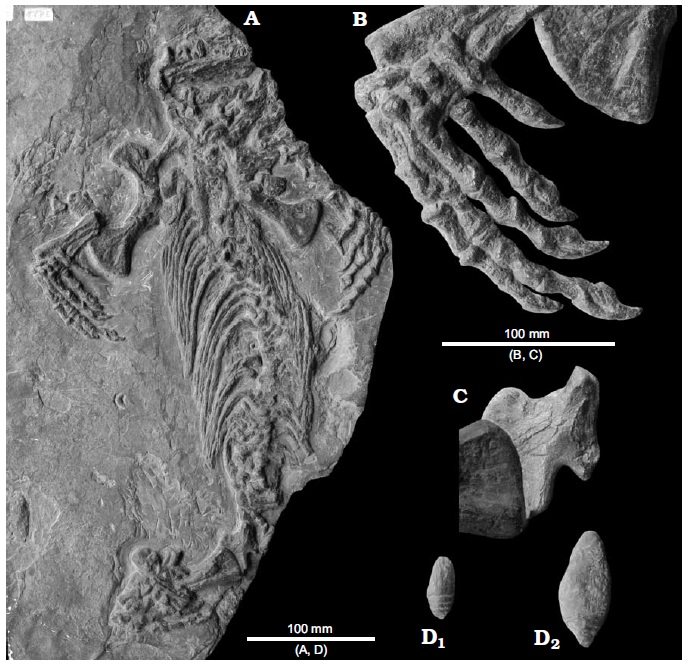
Holotype of the faunivorous caseid Callibrachion gaudryi preserved on the back (A). Detail of the right hand (B). Right ilium covered dorsally by the proximal end of the femur (C). Coprolites of sharks placed on the slab of the holotype during the 19th century (D).

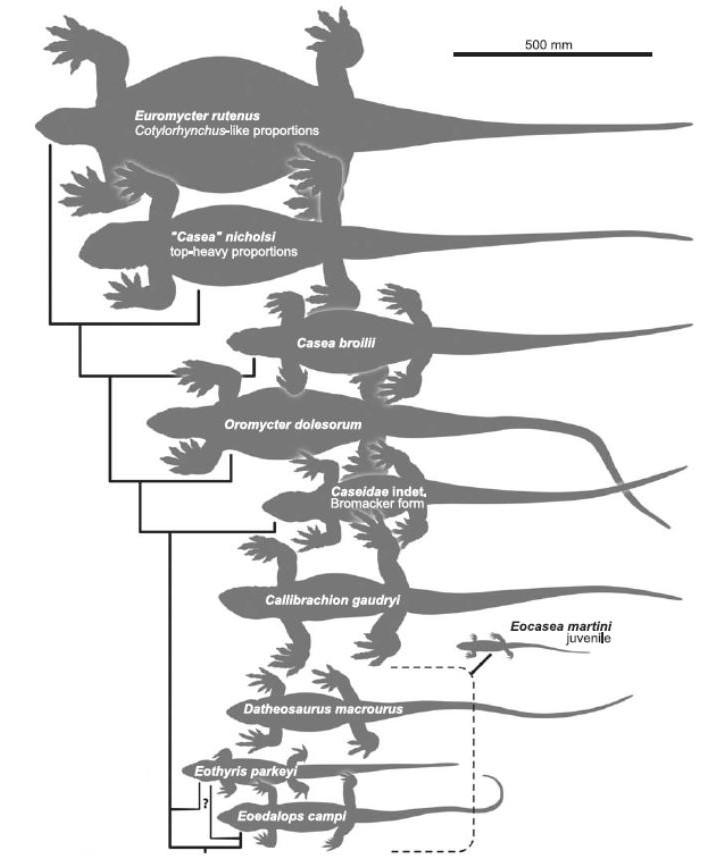
Comparison of size and proportions of the faunivorous and omnivorous basal caseasaurs with the herbivorous caseid Euromycter.

During their evolutionary history, caseids shifted from faunivorous to herbivorous diet, a pattern that also occurred independently in other Carboniferous and Permian tetrapod groups such as Captorhinidae and Edaphosauridae. Earliest and most basal caseids, such as the late Carboniferous Eocasea and the early Permian Callibrachion had an unexpanded rib cage and dentition composed of very small conical teeth suggesting an insectivorous diet. Another basal caseid, Martensius, has a slightly enlarged barrel-shaped trunk and dentition in which teeth indicative of an insectivorous diet in juveniles have been ontogenetically replaced in adults by teeth suggesting an omnivorous diet. In Martensius, the adult was still able to feed on insects, but it also possesses a draft of the herbivorous diet specializations present in later caseids, such as a relatively short, slightly forward-inclined snout, and a dentition that is almost homodont in the upper jaws and completely homodont in lower jaws. The sequence of dental trait acquisition in Martensius suggests that intestinal vegetation processing preceded oral processing in the evolution of caseid herbivory. A juvenile insectivorous diet would have provided the opportunity for successful introduction into the intestine of microorganisms capable of endosymbiotic cellulolysis, particularly if the prey ingested were herbivorous insects which harbor such microorganisms in their viscera. Subsequently, the caseids adopted a strictly herbivorous diet and evolved into gigantic forms. These herbivorous caseids had spatulate teeth equipped with more or less numerous cuspules and a very enlarged and barrel-shaped rib cage which must have housed highly developed intestines necessary for the digestion of plants with low nutritional value. This adaptation would partly explain the diversification and expansion of the group at the end of the Lower Permian and during the Middle Permian, because it allowed them to exploit a fiber-rich plant resource that had by then become abundant and widespread. Nevertheless, small probably faunivorous caseids like Phreatophasma seem to have persisted until the Middle Permian.

=== Semiaquatic vs terrestrial lifestyle ===
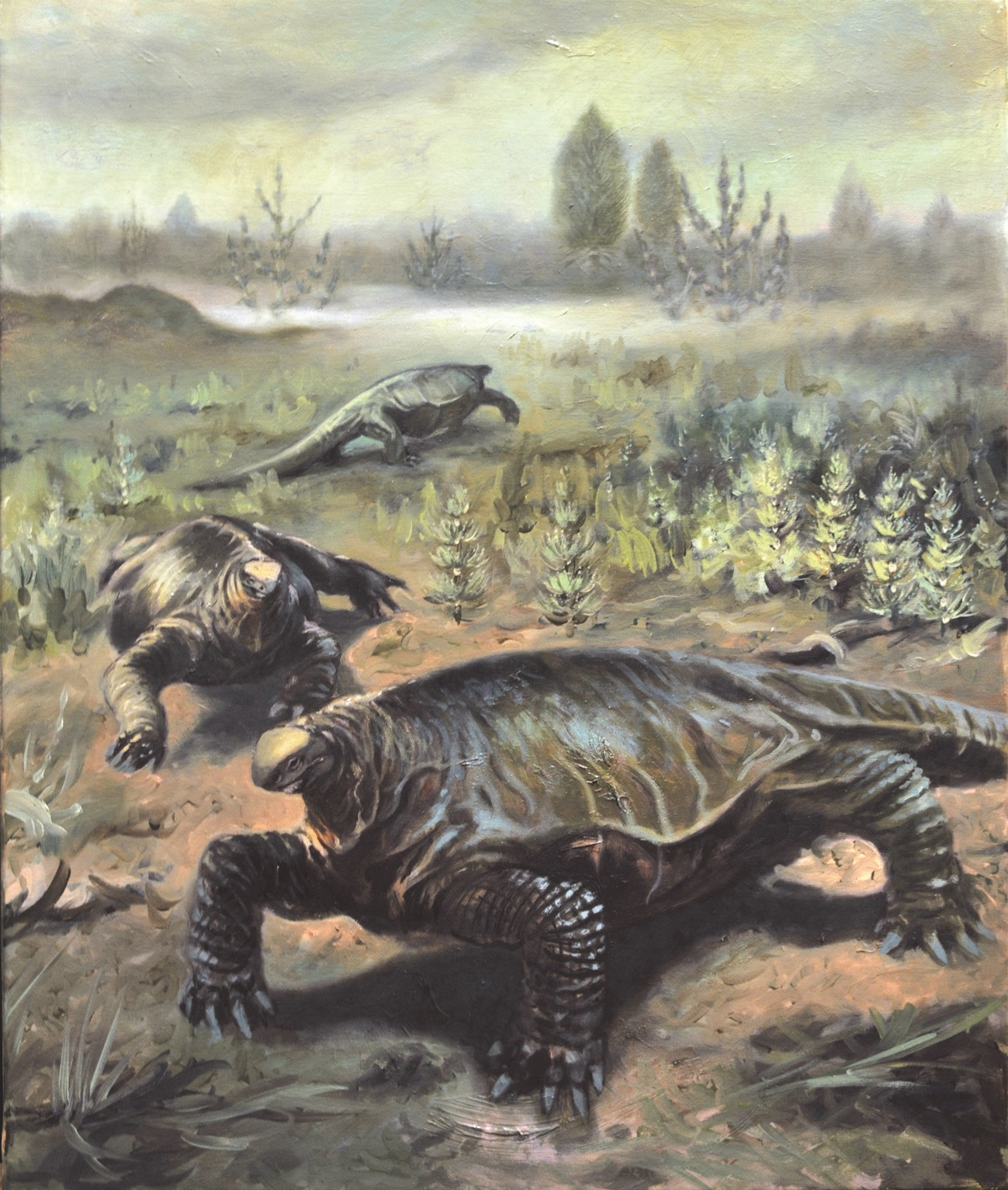
Reconstruction of Alierasaurus ronchii in a terrestrial environment.

Caseids are generally considered primarily terrestrial animals. Everett C. Olson in particular considered that the degree of ossification of the skeleton, the relatively short feet and hands, the massive claws, the limbs with very powerful extensor muscles, and the solid sacrum, strongly suggested a terrestrial lifestyle. Olson did not rule out that the caseids spent some time in water, but he considered locomotion on land to be an important aspect of their lifestyle. It has been suggested that the very powerful forelimbs, with strong and very tendinous extensor muscles, as well as very massive claws, could be used to dig up roots or tubers. However, the very short neck implied a low amplitude of vertical movements of the head which precluded the large species from feeding at ground level. Another hypothesis suggests that the caseids could have used their powerful forelimbs to fold large plants towards them, which they would have torn off with their powerful claws. Other hypotheses suggest that some caseids such as Cotylorhynchus used their limbs with powerful claws to defend themselves against predators, or during intraspecific activities linked in particular to reproduction. According to Olson, an interesting thing about this, is that almost all known specimens of the species Cotylorhynchus hancocki have one to ten ribs broken and healed during life. Finally, for some authors, the large derived caseids would have been semiaquatic animals that used their hands with large claws like paddles, which could also be used to manipulate the plants on which they fed.

In 2016, Markus Lambertz and colleagues questioned the terrestrial lifestyle of large caseids like Cotylorhynchus. These authors showed that the bone microstructure of the humerus, femur and ribs of adult and immature specimens of Cotylorhynchus romeri resembled that of aquatic animals more than that of terrestrial animals, the bones having a very spongy structure, an extremely thin cortex, and having no distinct medullary canal. This low bone density would have been a handicap for animals weighing several hundred kilos with a strictly terrestrial lifestyle. Lambertz et al. also argued that the joints between the vertebrae and the dorsal ribs allowed only small ranges of motion of the rib cage, thus limiting costal ventilation. To overcome this, they proposed that a proto-diaphragm was present to facilitate breathing, especially in aquatic environment. These authors also consider that the arid paleoclimates to which the caseid deposits correspond are not incompatible with an aquatic lifestyle of these animals. These paleoenvironments in fact included a significant number of water bodies (rivers, lakes and lagoons). The arid conditions could have been the reason why the animals would sometimes congregate and eventually die. In addition, arid environments have a low density of plants, which would require even more locomotor effort to find food. Thus, for Lambertz et al., large caseids like Cotylorhynchus must have been mainly aquatic animals that only came on dry land for the purposes of reproduction or thermoregulation.

This hypothesis is however disputed by Kenneth Angielczyk and Christian Kammerer as well as by Robert Reisz and colleagues based on paleontological and taphonomic data combined with the absence in these large caseids of morphological adaptations to an aquatic lifestyle. According to Angielczyk and Kammerer, the low bone density of caseids identified by Lambertz et al. does not resemble that of semiaquatic animals, which tend to have a more strongly ossified skeleton to provide passive buoyancy control and increased stability against current and wave action. Cotylorhynchus bone microstructure is more similar to what is seen in animals living in the open ocean, such as cetaceans and pinnipeds, which emphasize high maneuverability, rapid acceleration and hydrodynamic control of buoyancy. However, the caseid morphology was totally incompatible with a pelagic lifestyle. Thus, due to these unusual data, Angielczyk and Kammerer consider that the available evidence is still insufficient to question the more widely assumed terrestrial lifestyle of caseids. Robert Reisz and colleagues also dispute the supposed semiaquatic lifestyle of the caseids on the fact that the latter possess no morphological adaptations to an aquatic lifestyle and, in the case of the species Cotylorhynchus romeri, on the interpretation that this animal lived in a dry environment for part of the year as indicated by the presence of numerous skeletons of the amphibian Brachydectes preserved in aestivation and of the lungfish Gnathorhiza, another well-known aestivator.

In 2022, Werneburg and colleagues proposed a somewhat different semiaquatic lifestyle, in which large caseids like Lalieudorhynchus (whose bone texture is even more osteoporotic than in Cotylorhynchus) would be ecological equivalents of modern hippos, passing part of their time in the water (being underwater walkers rather than swimming animals) but coming on dry land for food.

== Evolution ==
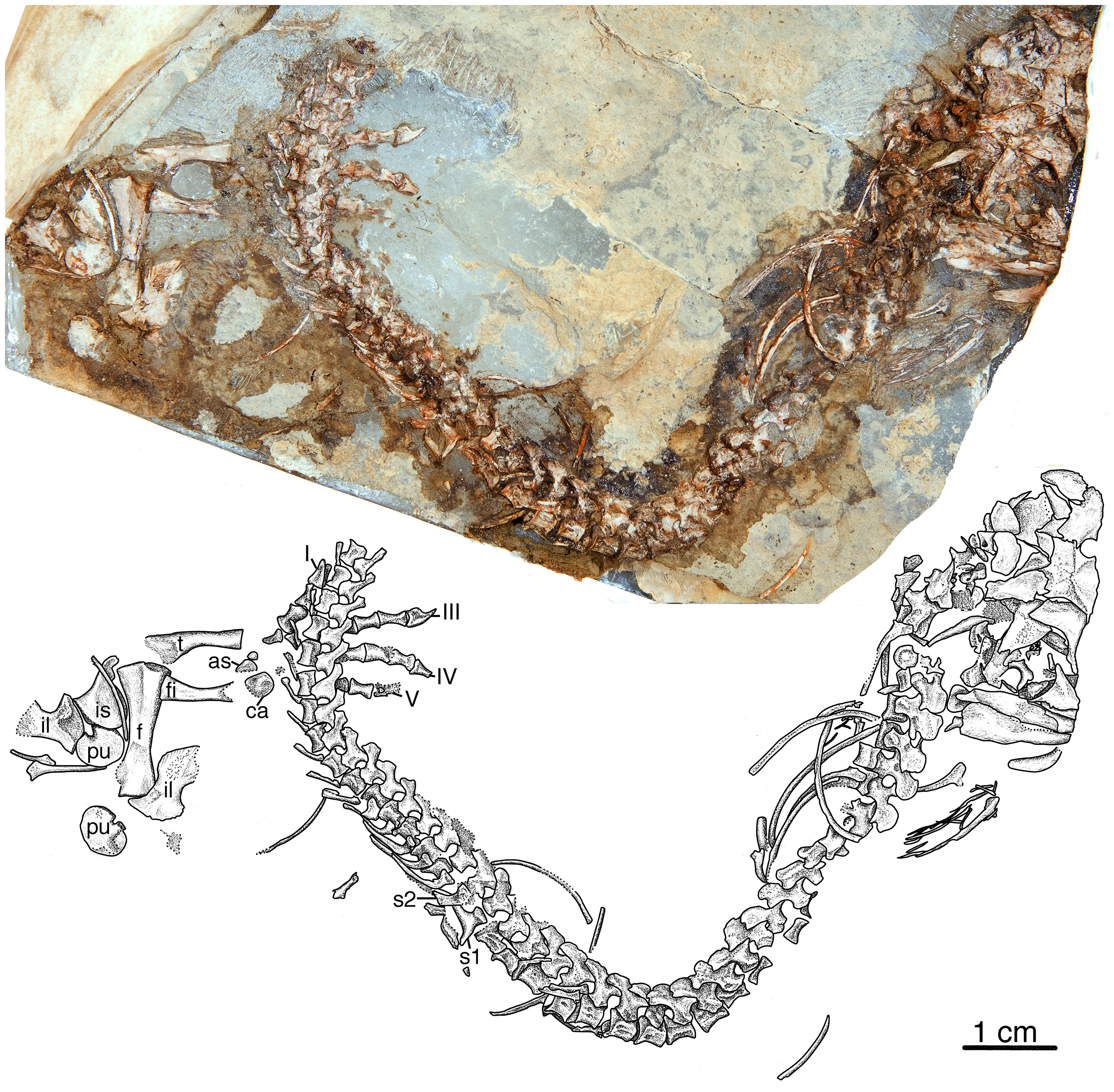
Holotype of Eocasea martini, one of the oldest known caseids with a Late Carboniferous age.

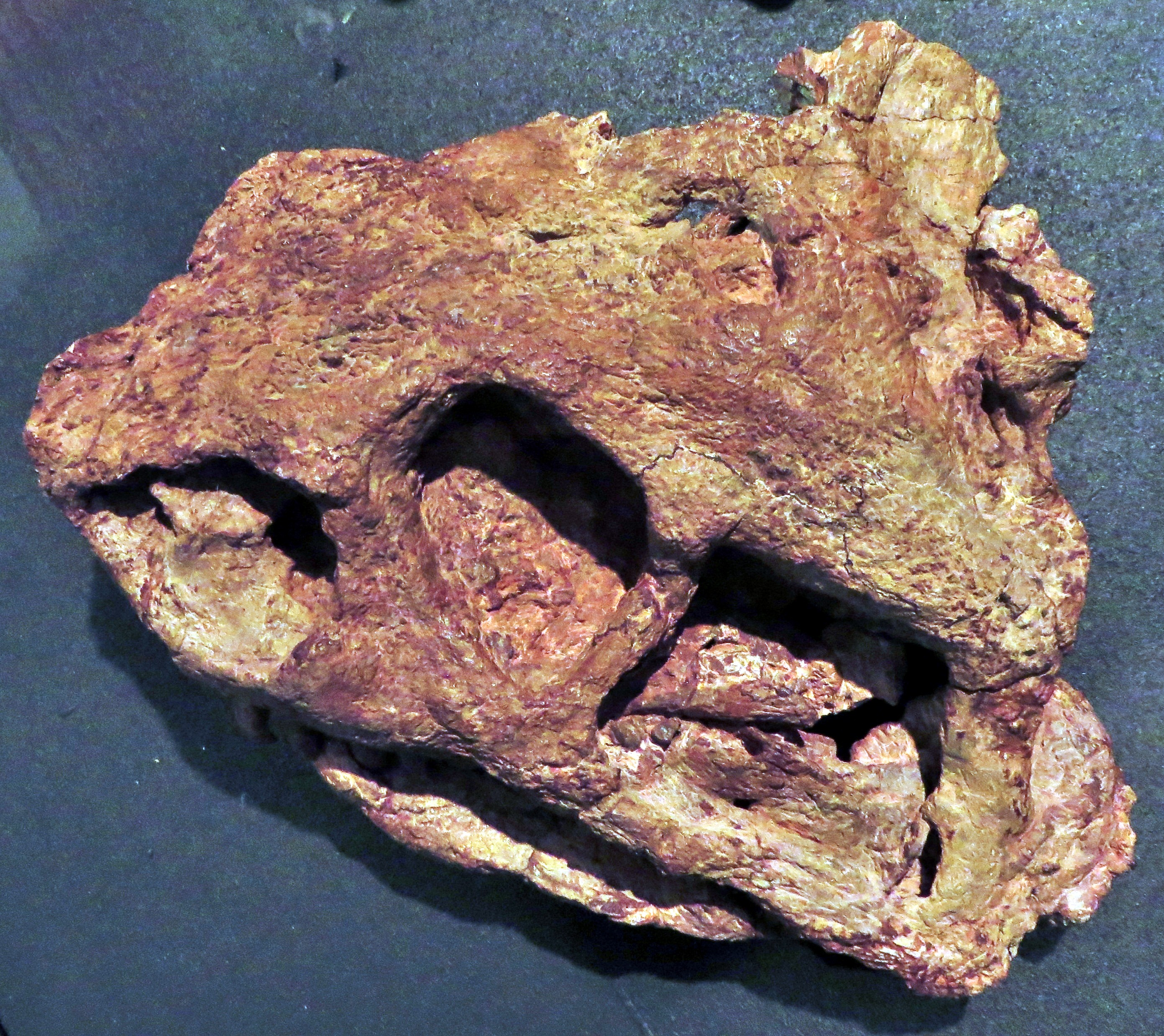
Skull of Ennatosaurus tecton from the Middle Permian, one of the last known caseids.

Caseids first appear in the fossil record at the end of the Carboniferous and are already present in both North America and Europe with small predatory forms like Eocasea and Datheosaurus. These faunivorous caseids also exist at the beginning of the lower Permian, such as Callibrachion, and may have existed until the base of the middle Permian with Phreatophasma. During the Permian, the representatives of the clade mainly evolved towards herbivory. These herbivorous caseids experienced an important evolutionary radiation during the second half of the lower Permian by becoming, with the moradisaurine captorhinid eureptiles, the main herbivores of terrestrial ecosystems instead of edaphosaurids and diadectids. The decline of edaphosaurids and the propagation of caseids coincides with an aridification of the environment that occurred from the Artinskian and which would have favored the caseid expansion. Sedimentological and taphonomic data indicate that the majority of edaphosaurids favored humid habitats (their remains are found mainly in lacustrine and marshy deposits) while herbivorous caseids generally lived in drier biotopes where ponds and streams water were ephemeral. The last caseids date from the Middle Permian and are mainly known in Europe with Phreatophasma and Ennatosaurus from the Roadian-Wordian of Russia, Alierasaurus from the Roadian-(Wordian?) of Sardinia, and Lalieudorhynchus from the late Wordian-early Capitanian of southern France. In North America, Angelosaurus romeri and Cotylorhynchus bransoni from the Chickasha Formation in Oklahoma probably date to the early Roadian, while the caseids from the San Angelo Formation in Texas are slightly older and may straddle the Kungurian-Roadian boundary but it is not yet clear whether they date from the latest Kungurian or from the earliest Roadian.

== Paleobiogeography ==
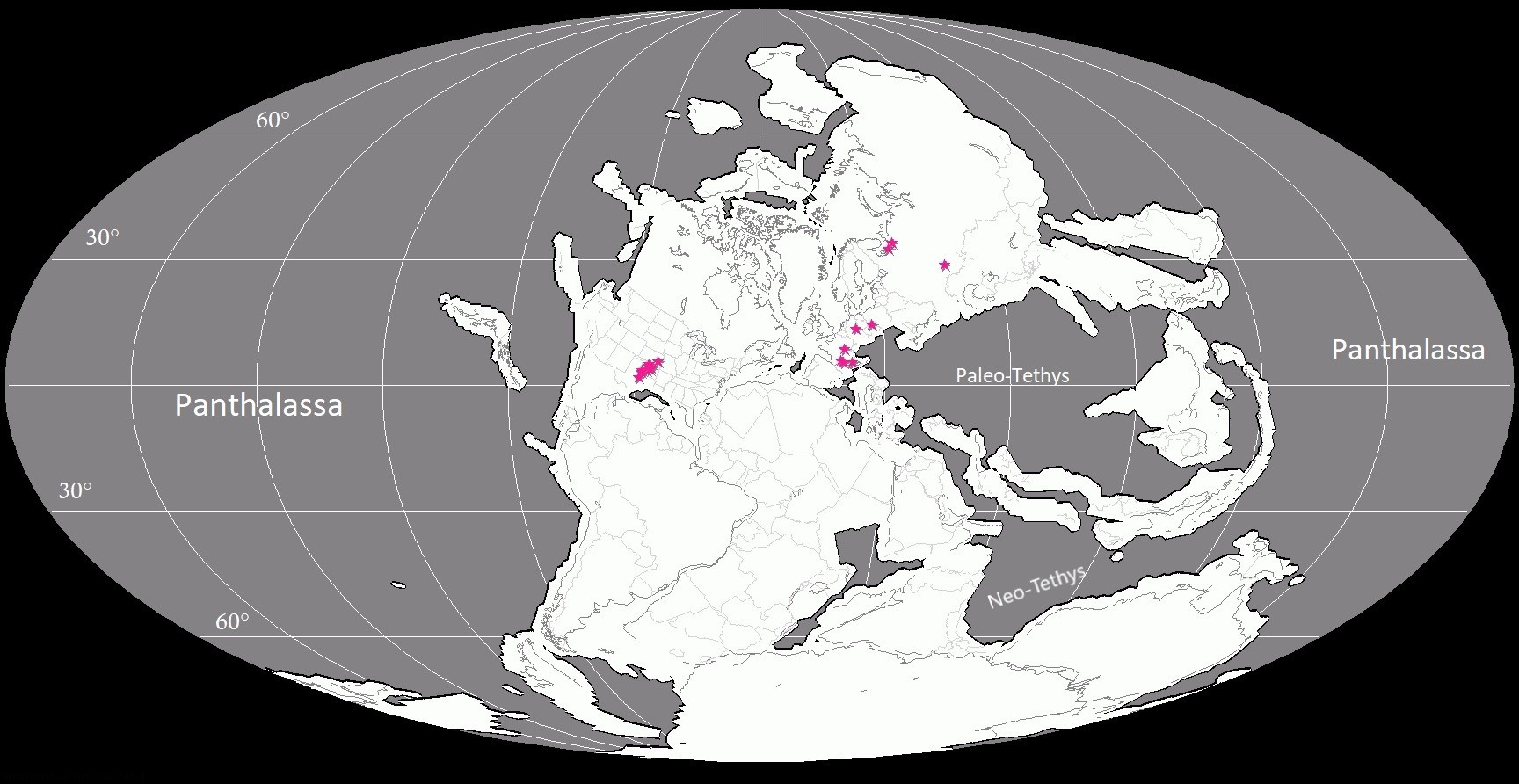
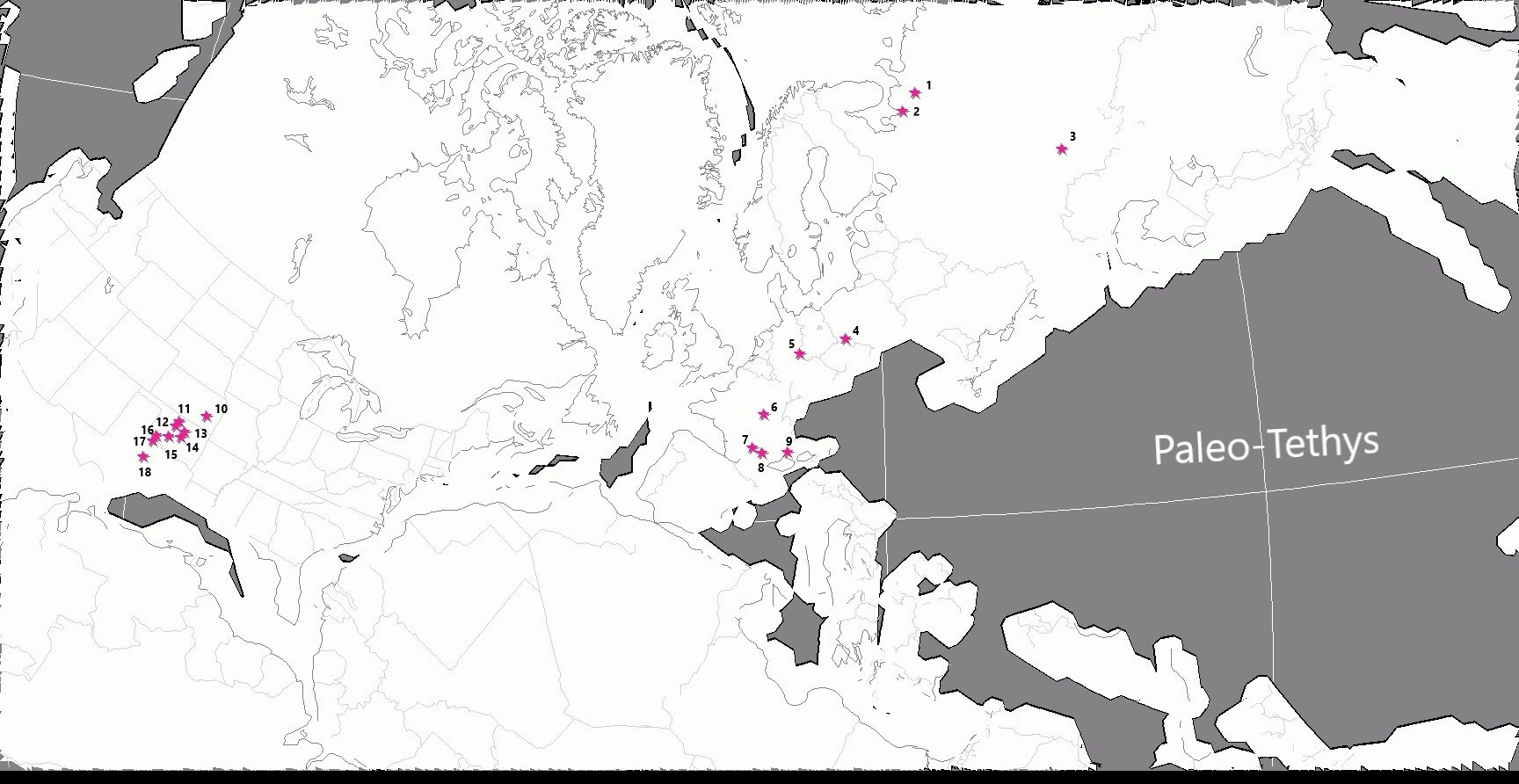
Left: paleogeographic map of Earth at the end of the Paleozoic showing the known distribution of caseid synapsids. Right: close-up of the paleogeographic location of the caseid sites. 1 and 2 Ennatosaurus tecton, Arkhangelsk Oblast, Russia, late Roadian – early Wordian; 3 Phreatophasma aenigmaticum, Bashkortostan, Russia, early Roadian; 4 Datheosaurus macrourus Lower Silesian Voivodeship, Poland, Gzhelian; 5 Martensius bromackerensis, Thuringia, Germany, Sakmarian; 6 Callibrachion gaudryi, Saône-et-Loire, France, Asselian; 7 Euromycter rutenus and Ruthenosaurus russellorum, Aveyron, France, late Artinskian; 8 Lalieudorhynchus gandi, Hérault, France, Wordian – early Capitanian; 9 Alierasaurus ronchii, Nurra, Sardinia, Italy, Roadian; 10 Eocasea martini, Greenwood County, Kansas, late Pennsylvanian; 11 Angelosaurus romeri and Cotylorhynchus bransoni, Kingfisher County, Oklahoma, early Roadian; 12 Cotylorhynchus bransoni, Blaine County, Oklahoma, early Roadian; 13 Cotylorhynchus romeri, Logan County, Oklahoma, mid-late Kungurian; 14 Cotylorhynchus romeri, Cleveland County, Oklahoma, mid-late Kungurian; 15 Oromycter dolesorum and Arisierpeton simplex, Comanche County, Oklahoma, early Artinskian; 16 Cotylorhynchus hancocki, Hardeman County, Texas, late Kungurian – early Roadian; 17 Cotylorhynchus hancocki, Angelosaurus dolani, A. greeni, Caseoides sanangeloensis, and Caseopsis agilis, Knox County, Texas, late Kungurian – early Roadian; 18 Casea broilii, Baylor County, Texas, mid-late Kungurian.

Caseid fossils have been found in the southern and central United States (Texas, Oklahoma, Kansas), France, Germany, Poland, Sardinia, and European Russia. This geographical distribution corresponds to the paleoequatorial belt of Pangaea during the Carboniferous and the Permian, with the exception of the Russian localities which were located at the level of the 30th parallel north where a more temperate climate prevailed. The absence in Russia of terrestrial vertebrate localities prior to the Kungurian does not allow us to know the precise moment of the arrival of caseids in this region of the world. According to Werneburg and colleagues, the presence of caseids at this paleolatitude suggests their possible existence in the temperate regions of Gondwana.

One possible Gondwanan occurrence was proposed as early as the 1990s by Michael S.Y. Lee and in 2021 by Asher J. Lichtig and Spencer G. Lucas, who reinterpreted the middle Permian taxon Eunotosaurus from South Africa as a small burrowing caseid. Between these two dates and after, most researchers classify Eunotosaurus a sauropsid either as a parareptile, a pantestudine, or a millerettid stem-reptile.

Elsewhere in Gondwana, the presence of the ichnotaxon Dimetropus in the Permian of Morocco suggests the future discovery of basal synapsids (including caseids) in the Permian basins of North Africa, which were also part of the paleoequatorial belt and constituted one of the main migratory routes between the Northern and Southern Hemispheres.

== Phylogeny ==
The family Caseidae was erected by Samuel Wendell Williston in 1911. In 1940, Alfred Sherwood Romer and L.W. Price placed Caseidae and Edaphosauridae in the same suborder, which they named Edaphosauria. This group is now abandoned, the edaphosaurids being closer to the Sphenacodontia (with which they form the clade Sphenacomorpha) than to the caseids. The latter are grouped with the Eothyrididae in the clade Caseasauria, which represent the most basal synapsids.

The first phylogenetic analysis of caseids was published in 2008 by Hillary C. Maddin and colleagues. In this analysis, the genus Oromycter occupies the most basal position within the clade. Ennatosaurus is the sister group of a clade containing Cotylorhynchus romeri and Angelosaurus dolani. This analysis reveals for the first time the paraphyly of the genus Casea, the species "Casea" rutena representing a distinct genus which will be named in 2011 Euromycter.

Below is the first cladogram of caseids published by Maddin et al. in 2008.

- Caseasauria
  - Eothyris
  - Caseidae
    - Oromycter dolesorum
    - - Casea broilii
      - - "Casea" rutena
        - - Ennatosaurus tecton
          - - Cotylorhynchus romeri
            - Angelosaurus dolani

Another phylogenetic analysis carried out in 2012 by Benson includes the genus Trichasaurus which occupies an intermediate position between Casea broilii and "Casea" rutena. Ennatosaurus is identified as the sister group of a clade including Angelosaurus and the three species of Cotylorhynchus. Within the latter genus, Cotylorhynchus romeri is the sister group of the two species C. hancocki and C. bransoni.

Below is the cladogram of Caseasauria published by Benson in 2012.

- Caseasauria
  - Eothyrididae
    - Eothyris parkeyi
    - Oedaleops campi
  - Caseidae
    - Oromycter dolesorum
    - - Casea broilii
      - - Trichasaurus texensis
        - - "Casea" rutena
          - - Ennatosaurus tecton
            - - Angelosaurus romeri
              - - Cotylorhynchus romeri
                - - Cotylorhynchus hancocki
                  - Cotylorhynchus bransoni

In 2015, Marco Romano and Umberto Nicosia published the first cladistic study including almost all Caseidae (with the exception of Alierasaurus ronchii from Sardinia, then considered too fragmentary). This study again resolves the genus Casea as paraphyletic, with the species "Casea" nicholsi representing a distinct unnamed genus. In their most parsimonious analysis, Ruthenosaurus is closely related to Cotylorhynchus hancocki. Ennatosaurus occupies a higher position than in previous analyses, and is identified as more closely related to Angelosaurus dolani. However, the close relationship between A. dolani and Ennatosaurus may be biased by the extreme incompleteness of the material from the North American species.

Below is the cladogram of caseids published by Romano and Nicosia in 2015.

- Caseasauria
  - Eothyris parkeyi
  - Caseidae
    - Oromycter dolesorum
    - - Casea broilii
      - - Euromycter rutenus
        - - - Caseoides sanangeloensis
            - - "Casea" nicholsi
              - Caseopsis agilis
          - - - Cotylorhynchus bransoni
              - - Cotylorhynchus romeri
                - - Cotylorhynchus hancocki
                  - Ruthenosaurus russellorum
            - - Angelosaurus romeri
              - - Angelosaurus dolani
                - Ennatosaurus tecton

A phylogenetic analysis published in 2016 by Neil Brocklehurst and colleagues includes for the first time the genera Callibrachion and Datheosaurus which are identified as basal caseids occupying an intermediate position between Eocasea and Oromycter.

Below is the phylogenetic analysis published by Neil Brocklehurst and colleagues in 2016.

- Caseasauria
  - Eothyrididae
  - Caseidae
    - Eocasea martini
    - - Callibrachion gaudryi
      - - Datheosaurus macrourus
        - - Oromycter dolesorum
          - - Casea broilii
            - - Trichasaurus texensis
              - - Euromycter rutenus
                - Casea nicholsi
                - - - Ennatosaurus teton
                    - - Angelosaurus romeri
                      - - - Cotylorhynchus romeri
                          - - Cotylorhynchus bransoni
                            - Cotylorhynchus hancocki

In 2017 Romano and colleagues published the first phylogenetic analysis including the genus Alierasaurus. The latter is recovered as the sister taxon of the genus Cotylorhynchus.

Below is the phylogenetic analysis published by Romano and colleagues in 2017.

- Caseasauria
  - Eothyris parkeyi
  - Caseidae
    - Oromycter dolesorum
    - - Casea broilii
      - - Euromycter rutenus
        - - - Caseoides sanangeloensis
            - - Caseopsis agilis
              - "Casea" nicholsi
          - - - Ennatosaurus tecton
              - - Angelosaurus greeni
                - Angelosaurus romeri
            - - - Alierasaurus ronchii
                - - Cotylorhynchus bransoni
                  - - Cotylorhynchus hancocki
                    - Cotylorhynchus romeri

In describing the species Martensius bromackerensis in 2020, Berman and colleagues published two cladograms in which Martensius is identified as one of the most basal caseids, and is positioned just above the Late Carboniferous Eocasea martini. In the first cladogram, the position of the remaining caseids is poorly resolved. In the second cladogram, Casea broilii is positioned above Martensius bromackerensis, and is followed by a polytomy between Oromycter dolesorum, Trichasaurus texensis, and a clade of remaining caseid. Within these remaining taxa, a sequence of branching taxa begins with Casea nicholsi, followed by Euromycter rutenus, then Ennatosaurus tecton, then Angelosaurus romeri, then an apical clade of the three Cotylorhynchus species plus Alierasaurus ronchii. In this final clade, Cotylorhynchus hancocki and C. bransoni are sister taxa and the clade forms a polytomy with C. romeri and Alierasaurus ronchii.

Below are the two caseid cladograms published by Berman and colleagues in 2020.

- Caseidae
  - Eocasea martini
  - - - Martensius bromackerensis
      - - Casea broilii
        - Oromycter dolesorum
        - Trichasaurus texensis
        - Casea nicholsi
        - Euromycter rutenus
        - - Ennatosaurus tecton
          - - Angelosaurus romeri
            - Alierasaurus ronchii
            - Cotylorhynchus romeri
            - Cotylorhynchus bransoni
            - Cotylorhynchus hancocki

- Caseidae
  - Eocasea martini
  - - - Martensius bromackerensis
      - - Casea broilii
        - - Oromycter dolesorum
          - Trichasaurus texensis
          - - Casea nicholsi
            - - Euromycter rutenus
              - - Ennatosaurus tecton
                - - Angelosaurus romeri
                  - - Alierasaurus ronchii
                    - Cotylorhynchus romeri
                    - - Cotylorhynchus bransoni
                      - Cotylorhynchus hancocki

In 2022, Werneburg and colleagues described the genus Lalieudorhynchus and published a phylogenetic analysis which concluded that the genera Angelosaurus and Cotylorhynchus are paraphyletic and are represented only by their type species. In this analysis, Cotylorhynchus romeri is positioned just above the genus Angelosaurus, and forms a polytomy with a clade containing Ruthenosaurus and Caseopsis and another clade containing Alierasaurus, the two other species of Cotylorhynchus and Lalieudorhynchus. Within this latter clade, Alierasaurus is the sister group of "Cotylorhynchus" bransoni and a more derived clade including Lalieudorhynchus and "Cotylorhynchus" hancocki.

Below is the cladogram published by Werneburg and colleagues in 2022.

- Caseidae
  - Martensius bromackerensis
  - - - Oromycter dolesorum
      - - Casea
        - - "Casea" nicholsi
          - - Euromycter
            - - Ennatosaurus
              - - Angelosaurus dolani
                - "Angelosaurus" romeri
                - - - Ruthenosaurus
                    - Caseopsis
                  - Cotylorhynchus romeri
                  - - Alierasaurus
                    - - "Cotylorhynchus" bransoni
                      - - Lalieudorhynchus
                        - "Cotylorhynchus" hancocki
