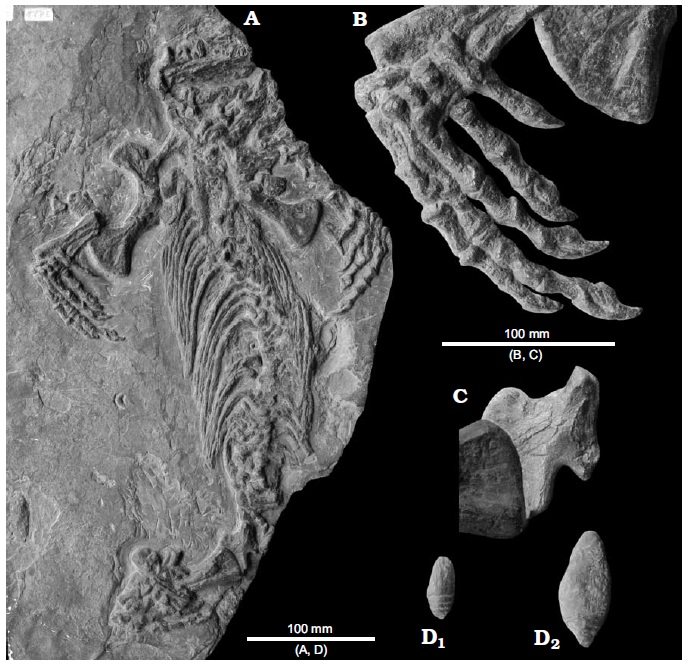
- Holotype of the Callibrachion gaudryi preserved on the back (A). Detail of the right hand (B). Right ilium covered dorsally by the proximal end of the femur (C). Coprolites of sharks placed on the slab of the holotype during the 19th century (D).

Scientific classification
- Kingdom: Animalia
- Phylum: Chordata
- Clade: Synapsida
- Clade: †Caseasauria
- Family: †Caseidae
- Genus: †Callibrachion; Boule and Glangeaud, 1893

Species
- †Callibrachion gaudryi Boule and Glangeaud, 1893 (type)

= Callibrachion =

Callibrachion Temporal range: Early Permian, Asselian

Extinct genus of synapsids

Callibrachion is an extinct genus of caseid synapsids that lived in east-central France during the Lower Permian (Asselian). The holotype and only known specimen (MNHN.F.AUT490) is represented by an almost complete postcranial skeleton associated with skull fragments discovered at the end of the 19th century in the Permian Autun basin in Saône-et-Loire department, in the Bourgogne-Franche-Comté region. It belongs to an immature individual measuring less than 1.50 m in length. Callibrachion was long considered a junior synonym of the genus Haptodus and classified among the sphenacodontid pelycosaurs. In 2015, a new study found that Callibrachion was a different animal from Haptodus and that it was a caseasaur rather than a sphenacodontid. This was confirmed in 2016 by a cladistic analysis which recovered Callibrachion as a basal caseid. Callibrachion's sharp teeth and unenlarged ribcage indicate that this animal was likely faunivorous.

== Discovery ==
The holotype of Callibrachion was discovered in the 19th century in the Margenne site during oil shale mining then in progress in the Autun basin. The palaeontological richness of this basin allowed at the time to define the Autunian as a reference stage for the continental Lower Permian of Europe.

== Description ==
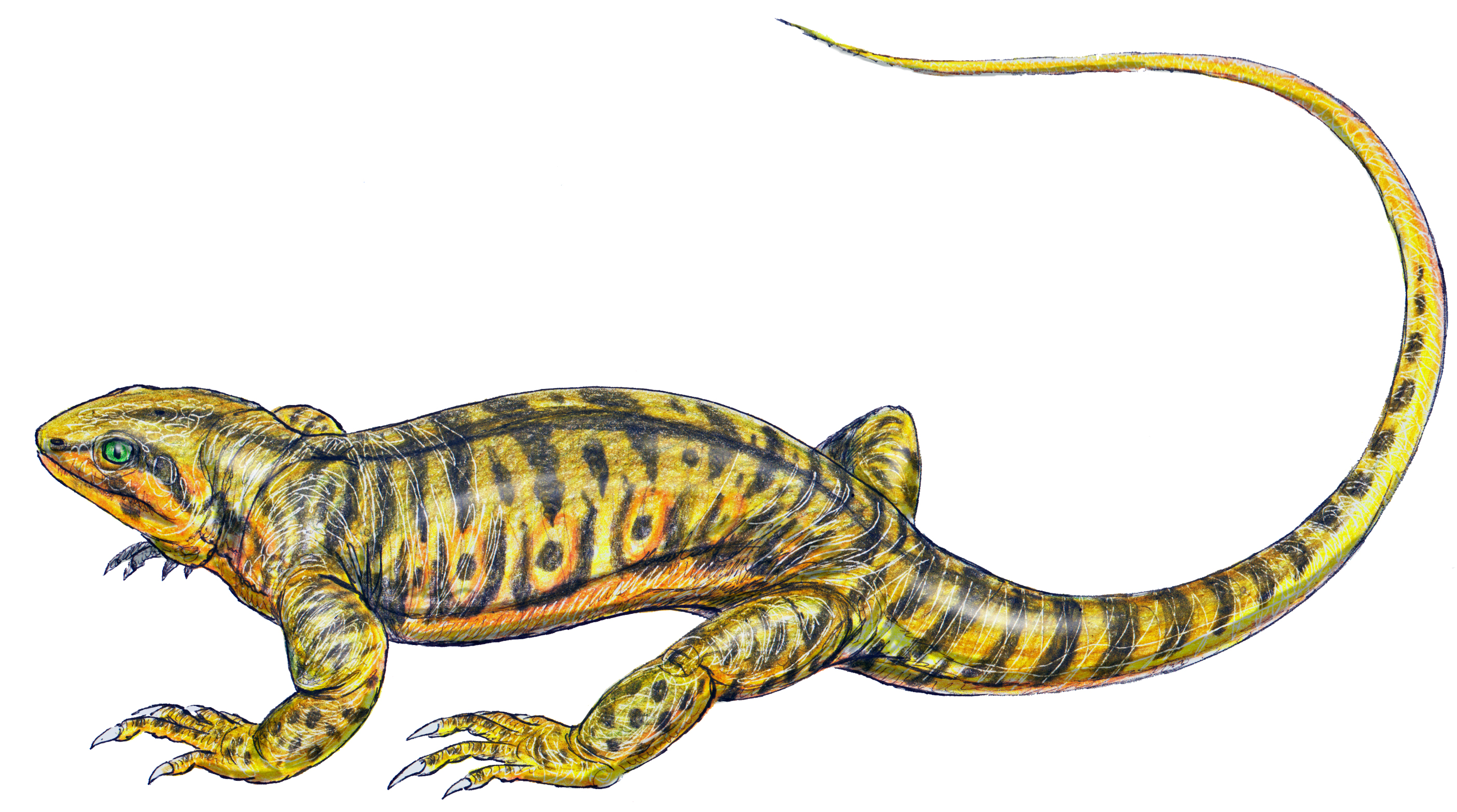
Life restoration

Callibrachion is known by a relatively complete but poorly preserved skeleton. It is preserved on a black shale slab which exposes the ventral side of the skeleton. The latter consists of a fragmentary skull, the rib cage, the forelimbs, and the right hindlimb. The left hindlimb and tail are missing as well as some parts of the shoulders and pelvis. The exposed notochordal canal and disarticulation of the scapulocoracoid and ilium (where the bony vasculature is visible) indicate an immature ontogenetic stage. In contrast, the well-ossified metapodials indicate that this is not an early juvenile. Although almost complete, no autapomorphies can be identified in Callibrachion due to the generally poor state of preservation of the specimen as well as the great incompleteness of the skull which usually concentrates many distinctive characters. Callibrachion is defined by a combination of characters such as fine and straight conical teeth, moderately thickened ribs, the possible presence of a closed ectepicondylar foramen, an ilium with the high dorsal lamina typical of caseids, robust but not enlarged phalanges, and an unreduced phalangeal formula.

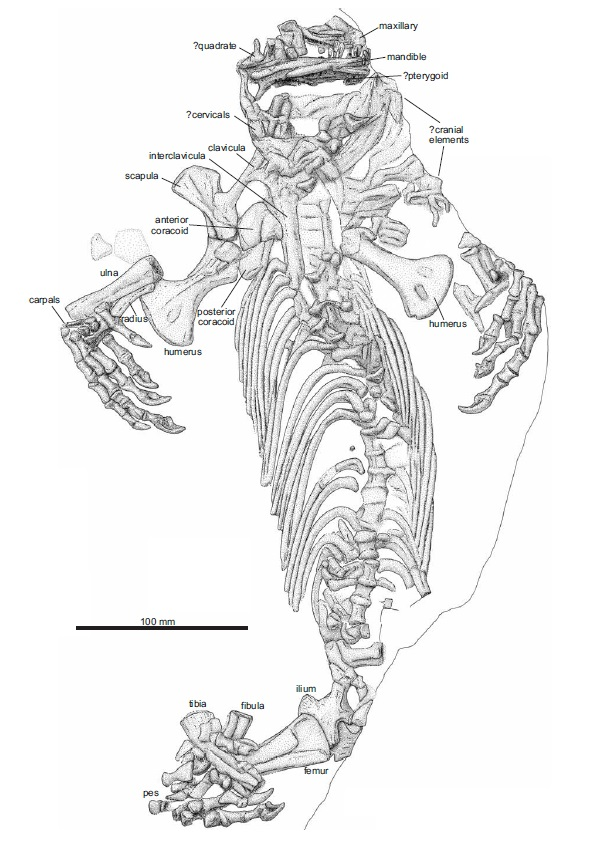
Explanatory drawing of the holotype

The skull is represented by several fragments of which only the maxilla (and possibly a portion of the premaxilla) is an element clearly identifiable by its row of marginal teeth. The ventral margin is slightly convex, with some large caniniform teeth at the anterior end indicated by the broad dental bases unlike the smaller ones preserved posterior to the latter. A second region of enlarged teeth is present posterior to the caniniform positions and is reminiscent of what is observed in eothyridids and in the basal caseid Martensius. It is not possible to provide an exact number of teeth or an estimate of the jaw length because the outline of the bone is uncertain. Preserved teeth have a thin, conical crown with a smooth surface, devoid of any significant curvature except in the anterior part of the preserved tooth row. The mandible is represented by a thin and rather shallow branch of the right jaw. Its preserved length of around 70 mm could be close to its original length, as large and slightly curved teeth are found in what is most likely the end of the dentary.

The vertebral column is represented by about twelve centra of dorsal vertebrae, as well as uncertain remains of the cervical series and neural arches. The tail is not preserved. Two barely visible cervical centra appear to lie between the skull and the shoulder girdle. Some vertebrae have been damaged during preparation, while others are covered by the shoulder girdle. Nevertheless, thanks to the articulation of the skeleton, it is possible to provide an estimate of the presacral number. In particular, the uninterrupted series of approximately 21 dorsal ribs indicates a minimum presacral number of 23 vertebrae. The ribs are robust. In the posterior dorsal region, the ribs decrease in length, but not in width.

The limbs are also strong. A distinctive feature is the scapula much shorter than the humerus. The two manus are fairly well preserved and articulated. The bones of the manus are strong and well developed. However, the metacarpals and phalanges do not exhibit the stocky and enlarged morphology of derived caseids. Their proportions are rather similar to those observed in Eocasea, Martensius, and Casea broilii. The digit IV is the longest in the series. One of its middle phalanges is shortened, measuring about 70% of the length of neighbouring phalanges. Terminal phalanges are strongly curved, with a strong flexor tubercle and an enlarged flat dorsal roof. The manus exhibits the plesiomorphic condition of early amniotes with a phalangeal formula of 2-3-4-5-3. (Note: The phalangeal formula corresponds to the number of phalanges constituting each digits of the manus and pes of tetrapods. It is listed starting from digit I (corresponding in human to the thumb and big toe) to digit V (the equivalent of the little finger and little toe).) The preserved elements of the right pes are for the most part disarticulated. It is not possible to precise its phalangeal formula, but the individual elements seem to be as robust and strongly developed as those of the manus.

== Classification ==
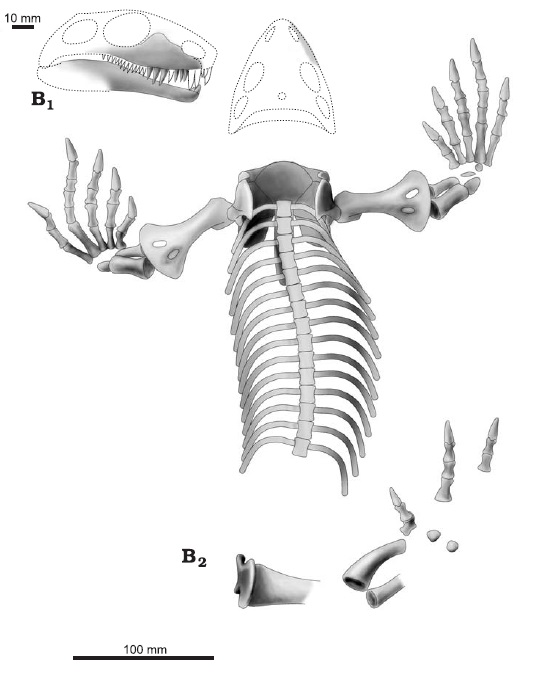
Reconstructed skeleton

From its description in 1893 until the late 1970s, most paleontologists who studied Callibrachion believed it to be close of species now classified as Sphenacodontidae. Some authors have also considered it to be a junior synonym of the genus Haptodus. In the 1990s, Michel Laurent came to doubt the synapsid nature of Callibrachion (then classified as Haptodus gaudryi) and considered it a nomen dubium. It was not until 2015 that the animal was re-studied by Spindler and colleagues and identified as a caseasaur on the basis of its overall proportions as well as dental and osteological characteristics that exclude it from any other synapsid clades. In 2016, a phylogenetic study of caseasaurs recovered Callibrachion as a basal caseid closely related to Eocasea and Datheosaurus.

Below is the phylogenetic analysis published by Neil Brocklehurst and colleagues in 2016. .

- Caseasauria
  - Eothyrididae
  - Caseidae
    - Eocasea martini
    - - Callibrachion gaudryi
      - - Datheosaurus macrourus
        - - Oromycter dolesorum
          - - Casea broilii
            - - Trichasaurus texensis
              - - Euromycter rutenus
                - Casea nicholsi
                - - - Ennatosaurus teton
                    - - Angelosaurus romeri
                      - - - Cotylorhynchus romeri
                          - - Cotylorhynchus bransoni
                            - Cotylorhynchus hancocki

== Paleobiology ==
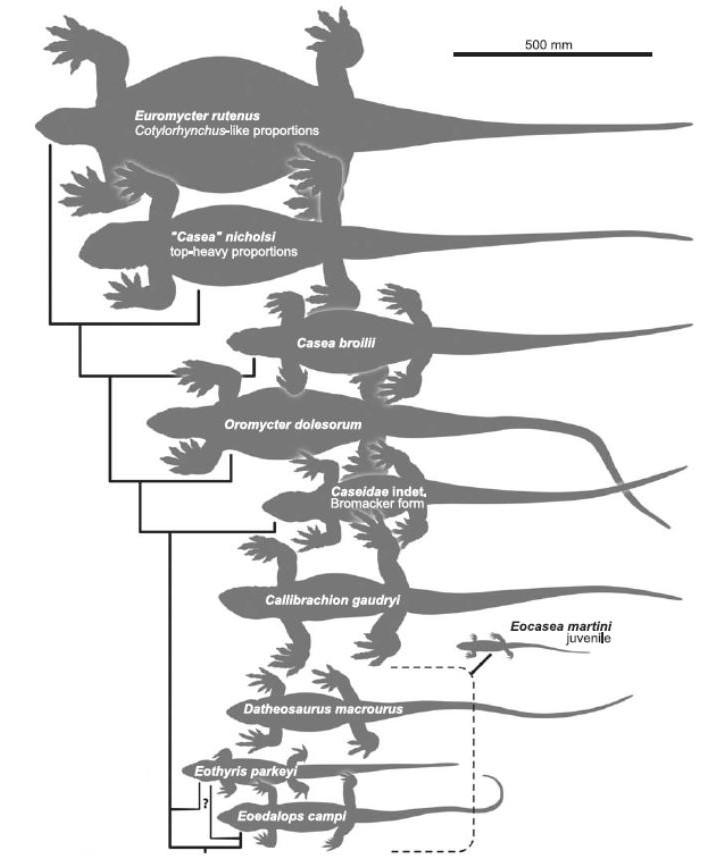
Size comparison of basal caseasaurs including Callibrachion.

The conical, thin, and slightly curved teeth of Callibrachion differ markedly from the spatulate or leaf-shaped teeth with cusps of later herbivorous caseids. They are more like those of the Eothyrididae and the basal caseid Martensius. The former were small predators, the latter was insectivorous in juvenile stage and omnivorous in adulthood. Callibrachion lacked the enlarged rib cage of derived herbivorous caseids which had a voluminous intestine necessary for digestion of high-fiber vegetation. The absence of this characteristic in Callibrachion as well as its particular dentition indicate that it was faunivorous and probably fed on insects and small vertebrates.

== Paleoecology ==
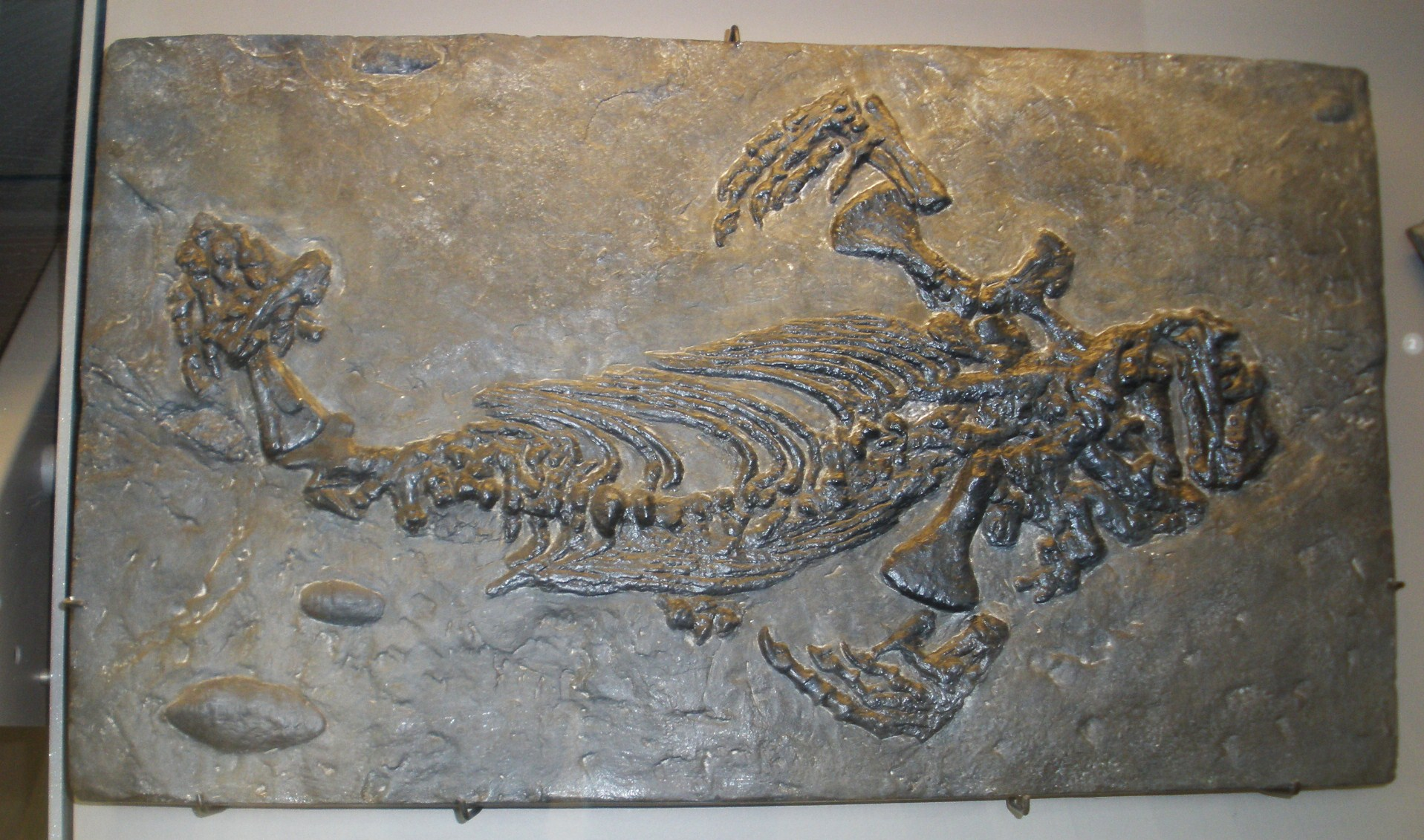
Cast, Musee d'Histoire Naturelle, Brussels

According to modern stratigraphy, the Margenne site belongs to the Millery Formation which is one of the youngest formations of the Autun basin. It corresponds to the upper part of the Autunian of the ancient authors. Based on plant, invertebrate, and amphibian fossils, the Autunian was considered to be an age equivalent to the global marine stages of the late Gzhelian, Asselian, Sakmarian, and Artinskian. Since the end of the 2010s, radiometric dating of volcanic ash (altered in tonsteins) intercalated in the sedimentary layers of several geological formations constituting the Autunian of the Autun basin revealed that the Autunian corresponded almost exclusively to the Asselian of the international geological time scale. The lower Autunian is represented by the Igornay and Muse formations. The middle part of the Igornay Formation is dated at 299.9 ± 0.38 Ma and represents the late Gzhelian (latest Carboniferous), confirming the first age estimates of the oldest Autunian levels. The Lally oil shale bed in the lower part of the Muse Formation is dated at 298.91 ± 0.08 Ma, which corresponds, at ± 100,000 years, to the Carboniferous-Permian boundary set in the marine strata in the Ural Mountains. The upper part of the Muse oil shale bed is dated between 298.05 ± 0.19 and 298.57 ± 0.16 Ma. These dates demonstrate that the lower Autunian corresponds to the late Gzhelian and early Asselian, and therefore encompasses the end of the late Carboniferous and the base of the early Permian. Two other levels of volcanic ash present at the top of the Muse Formation (lower-upper Autunian boundary) and in the upper part of the Millery Formation gave ages of 298.39 ± 0.09 Ma (Note: The inconsistency between this age of 298.39 ± 0.09 Ma from the top of the Muse formation with the younger age of 298.05 ± 0.19 Ma from an older level of the same formation could be explained by a rejuvenated age of the tonstein dated at 298.05 Ma. This rejuvenation would be due to the smaller size of the dated zircon grains and a possible loss of lead (cf. Mercuzot 2020, p. 249-250).) and 297.7 ± 0.08 Ma, the latter indicating an early-middle Asselian age. These dates indicate that the upper Autunian (represented by the Surmoulin, Millery, and Curgy formations) probably did not exceed an Asselian age. Thus, these dates prove that the five geological formations of the Autun basin which defined the Autunian represent a geological duration of less than 2.5 million years and include the Carboniferous-Permian boundary. This duration is significantly shorter than the 10 million years of deposits previously estimated. Thus, the genus Callibrachion from the Millery Formation, whose age was successively considered as Sakmarian or Artinskian, turns out to be older with an early or middle Asselian age. It is thus the oldest known Permian caseid, only surpassed in age by the Carboniferous taxa Eocasea and Datheosaurus.

The Millery Formation is 250 m thick and consists of dark gray oil shales deposited in a lacustrine environment. The volcanic ash, altered into tonsteins, preserved in these deposits is linked to an aerial explosive volcanism. The exact origin of these volcanic ash is uncertain but the closest active volcanoes to the Autun basin during the Carboniferous-Permian boundary were in the north of the Massif Central (Blismes and Montreuillon areas) and in the Black Forest and Vosges areas. The rare amniotes found in these lacustrine layers, such as Callibrachion, the small sphenacodontid Haptodus and the taxon of uncertain affinity "Belebey" augustodinensis (Note: Assigned to the bolosaurid genus Belebey by Jocelyn Falconnet (2012), this taxon is considered by Spindler and colleagues (2019) to be a nomen dubium, possibly representing an Edaphosauridae or a Captorhinidae .) (both known from another site in the same formation) are allochthonous. The temnospondyl Onchiodon, a smaller relative of the genus Eryops from North America, is also present.
