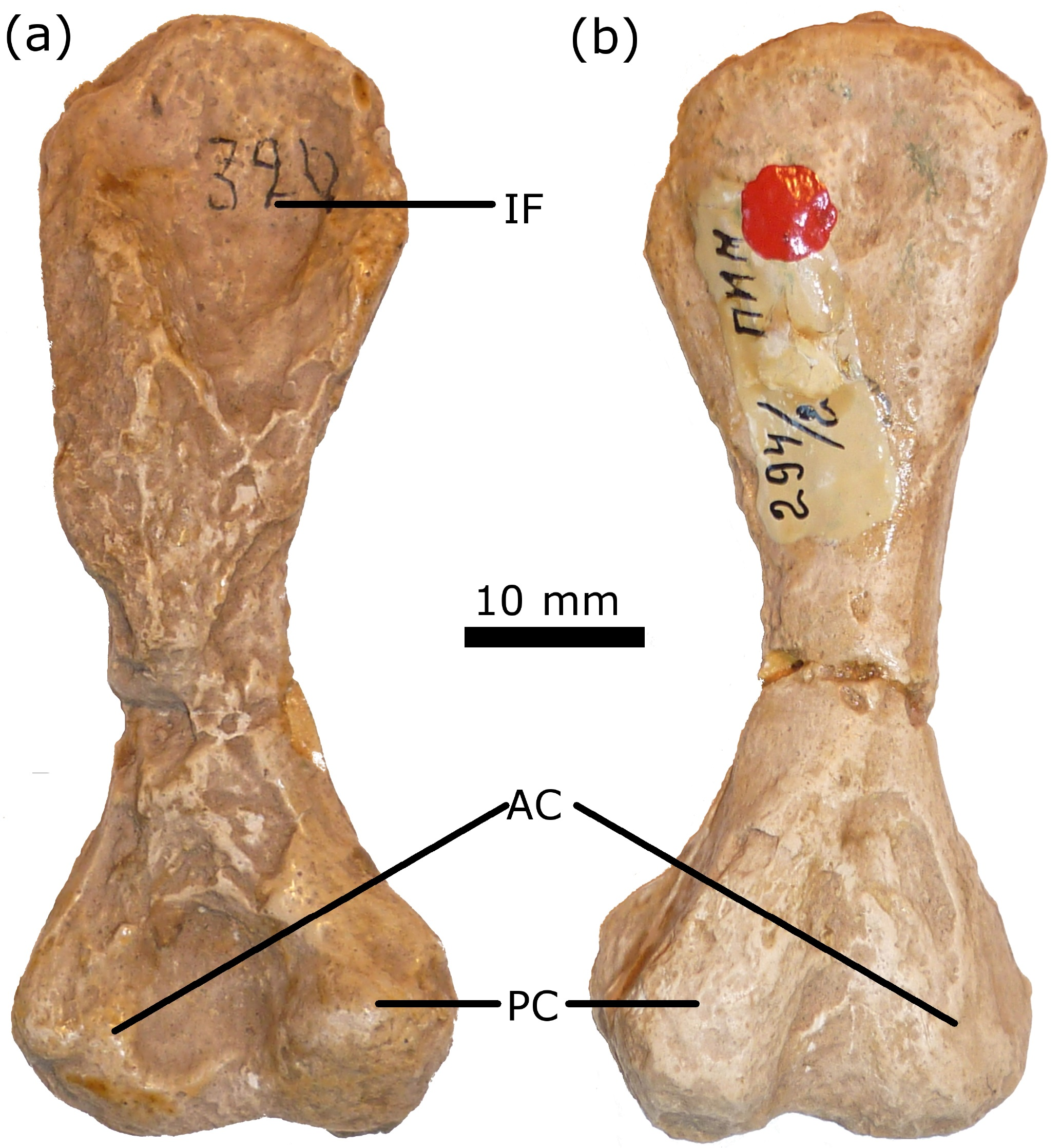
- Femur seen from two angles

Scientific classification
- Domain: Eukaryota
- Kingdom: Animalia
- Phylum: Chordata
- Clade: Synapsida
- Genus: †Phreatophasma; Yefremov, 1954
- Species: †P. aenigmatum

Binomial name
- †Phreatophasma aenigmatum Yefremov, 1954

= Phreatophasma =

Phreatophasma Temporal range: Middle Permian, 270 Ma

Extinct genus of synapsids

Phreatophasma is an extinct genus of synapsids from the Middle Permian of European Russia. It includes only one species, Phreatophasma aenigmatum, which is itself known from a single femur found in a mine near the town of Belebei in Bashkortostan. Phreatophasma comes from a fossil assemblage that is latest Ufimian to earliest Kazanian in age under the Russian stratigraphic scheme, correlating with the Roadian Age (earliest Middle Permian, about 270 million years ago) under the international stratigraphic timescale. Because the species is based on a single specimen with few diagnostic anatomical features, uncertainty remains as to where it belongs in tetrapod phylogeny; originally interpreted in 1954 as an enigmatic "theromorph" synapsid (hence its species name aenigmatum) by Soviet paleontologist Ivan Yefremov, Phreatophasma was later described as a therapsid incertae sedis by American paleontologist Alfred Romer in 1956 and then as a member of a basal synapsid family called Caseidae starting with Everett C. Olson in 1962. Olson's classification was later supported by Canadian paleontologist Robert Reisz in 1986 and American paleontologist Robert L. Carroll in 1988. Ivakhneneko et al. (1997) and Maddin et al. (2008) both considered Phreatophasma an indeterminate synapsid.

Golubev (2000) hypothesized that Phreatophasma is not a synapsid but rather a leptorophine parareptile closely related to Biarmica and Leptoropha (both of which are now considered seymouriamorphs), as all three were found in the same fossil assemblage and are similar anatomically. Another line of evidence supporting close affinities was that all three were found in transitional marine deposits within the assemblage (Phreatophasma in a brachiopod- and bryozoan-bearing limestone and Biarmica and Leptoropha in lagoon and delta deposits), settings which are not typical for terrestrial synapsids but possible for semi-aquatic seymouriamorphs.

The most recent examination of Phreatophasma using up-to-date knowledge of the postcranial anatomy of synapsids rejected therapsid and seymouriamorph affinities. Phylogenetic analysis found this species to be a basal member of Caseidae, a position that had important implications for the evolution of this family. This is only the second example of a caseid from the palaeo-temperate region of Russia, and it is not closely related to the first (Ennatosaurus tecton), implying at least two distinct dispersal events from the palaeoequatorial to temperate latitudes. It also implies that a number of plesiomorphic characteristics of caseids, including small body size and a relatively long femur, were retained as late as the middle Permian, a time when caseids were otherwise represented by large herbivorous taxa.

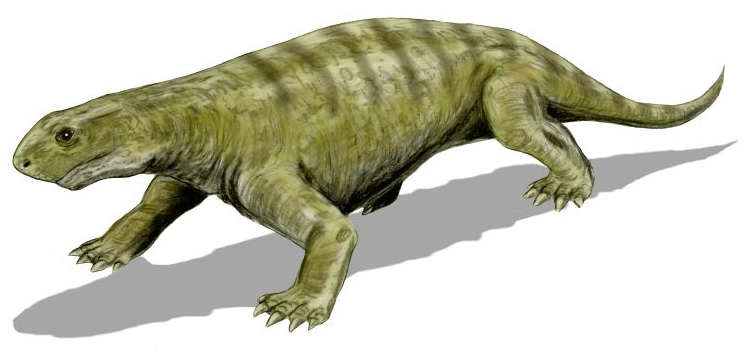
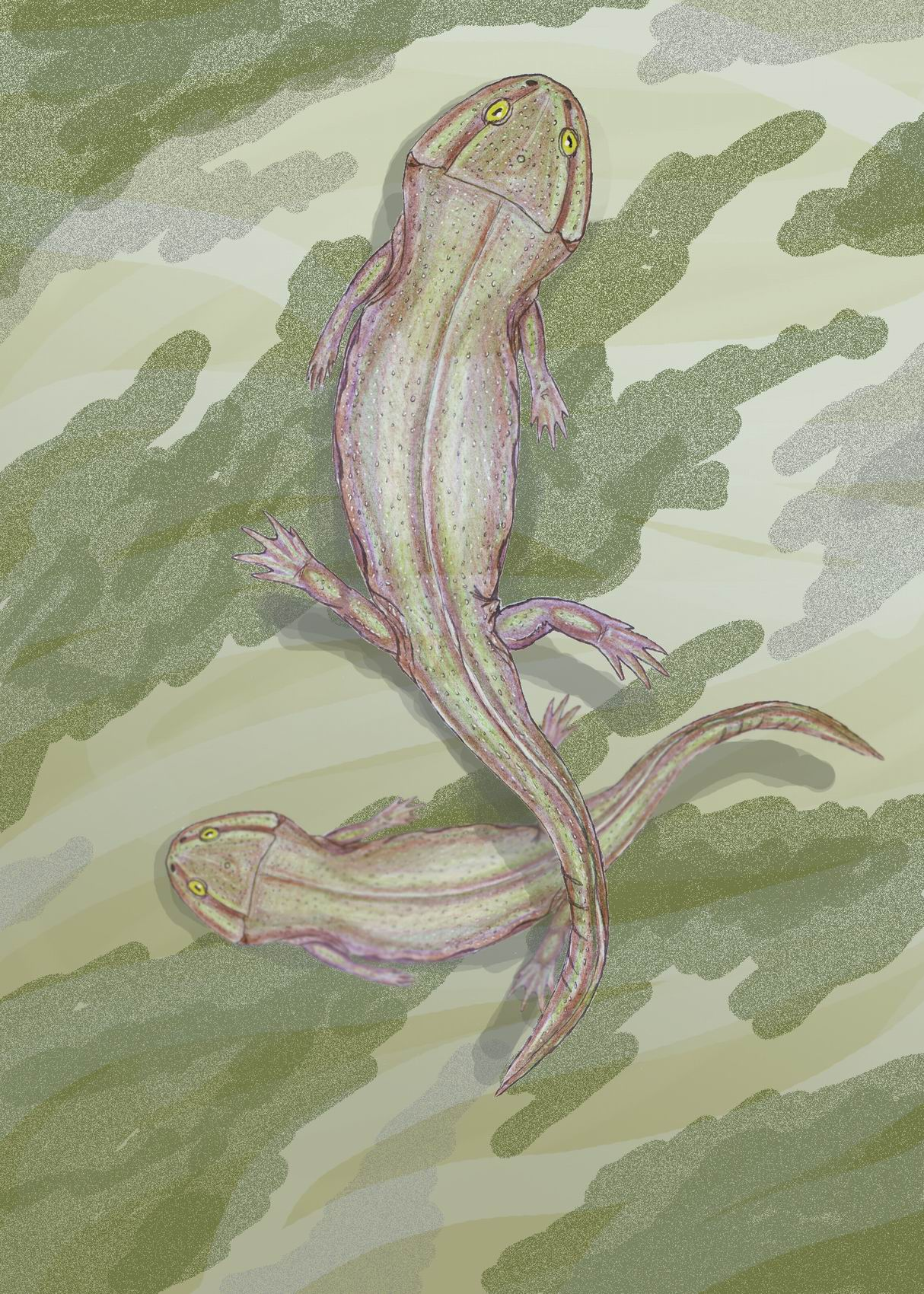
Two possible close relatives of Phreatophasma aenigmatum: Ennatosaurus tecton, a caseid (left); and Leptoropha talonophora, a seymouriamorph (right), both from the Middle Permian of Russia
