= Ivanovia =

Ivanovia Temporal range: Pennsylvanian-Triassic ~318–265 Ma

Scientific classification
- Kingdom: Plantae
- Division: Chlorophyta
- Class: Ulvophyceae
- Order: Bryopsidales
- Family: †Anchicodiaceae
- Genus: †Ivanovia; Khvorova 1946

Species
- Ivanovia permica Ivanovia tebagaensis Ivanovia tenuissima Ivanovia triassica

Extinct genus of algae

Ivanovia is an extinct genus of marine green algae belonging to the order Bryopsidales and family Anchicodiaceae (sometimes placed in the family Codiaceae). Species belonging to the genus lived from the Pennsylvanian to the Permian and have been found in the Moscow basin, North America, Italy, Tunisia, and China.

Members of the genus have thalli (leaflike photosynthetic structures) that are cyathiform (cuplike in shape.) There are indications that asexual reproduction took place through budding of the thalli. Sexual reproduction also took place, through reproductive structures in stalked outgrowths of the thalli (oogonia and gametangia, the female and male reproductive structures of green algae.)

Bioherms (fossil algal mounds) constructed by Ivanovia are prominent in the Paradox Formation of the Colorado Plateau, where they are important petroleum reservoirs.

It is possible that Ivanovia is a taphotaxon of Anchicondium or Eugonophyllum; that is, a characteristic diagenetic alteration of an original fossil organism that lacks taxonomic significance.
