= Taphotaxon =

Invalid taxon based on diagenetic alteration of a fossil

A taphotaxon (from the Greek ταφος, taphos meaning burial and ταξις, taxis meaning ordering) is an invalid taxon based on fossils remains that have been altered in a characteristic way during burial and diagenesis. The fossils so altered have distinctive characteristics that make them appear to be a new taxon, but these characteristics are spurious and do not reflect any significant taxonomic distinction from an existing fossil taxon. The term was first proposed by Spencer G. Lucas in 2001, who particularly applied it to spurious ichnotaxons, but it has since been applied to body fossils such as Nuia (interpreted as cylindrical oncolites formed around filamentous cyanobacteria) or Ivanovia (thought to be a taphotaxon of Anchicondium or Eugonophyllum); conulariids, and crustaceans.

In his original definition of the term, Lucas emphasized that he was not seeking to create a new field of taphotaxonomy. The term is intended simply as a useful description of a particular type of invalid taxon. It should not be used indiscriminately, particularly with ichnotaxons, where the fact that an ichnotaxon derives part of its morphology from taphonomic processes may not always render it an invalid ichnotaxon.
