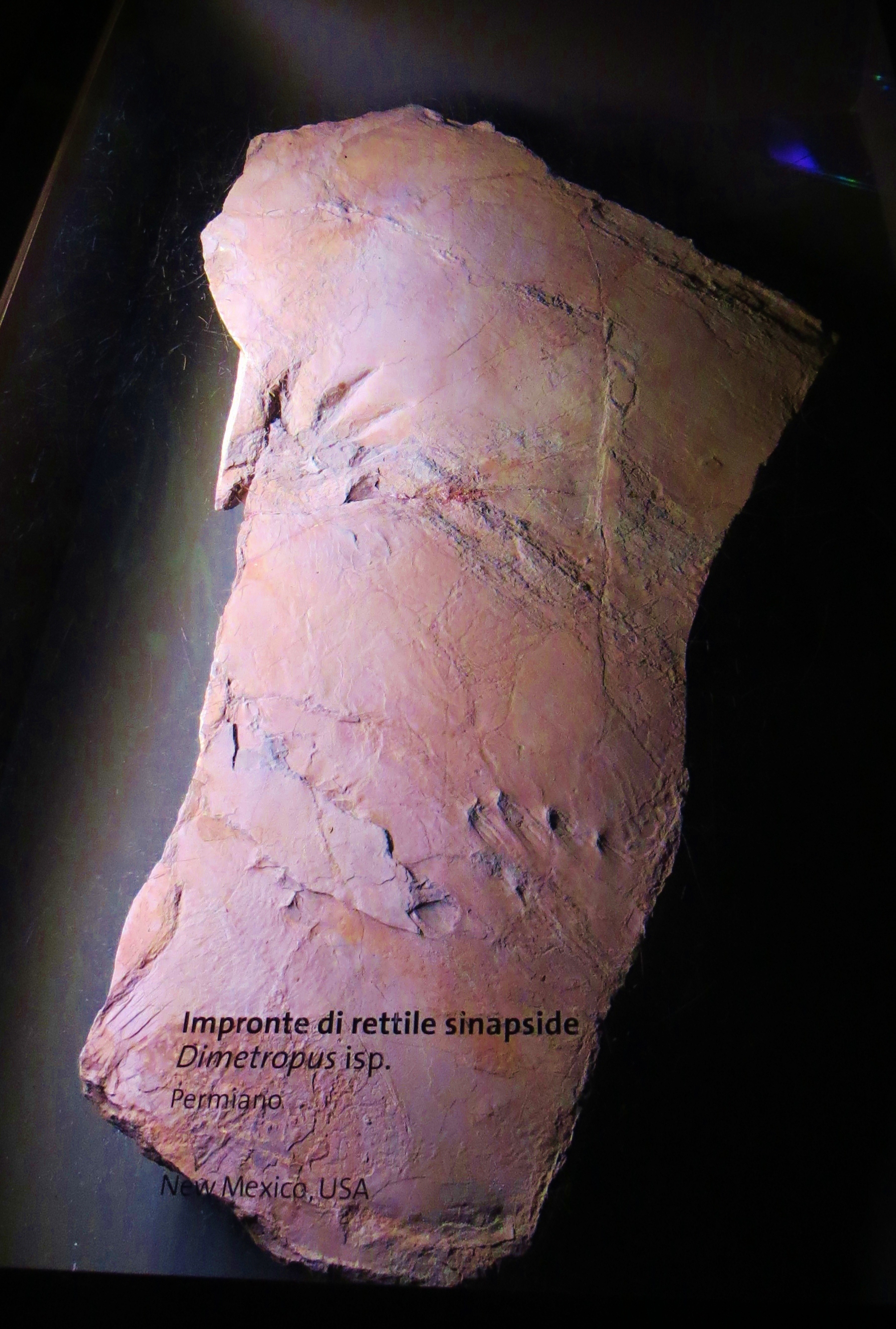
- Dimetropus

Trace fossil classification
- Ichnogenus: †Dimetropus; Romber and Price 1940

Ichnospecies
- D. leisnerianus Geinitz 1863; D. latus Heyler and Montenat 1980

= Dimetropus =

Dimetropus Temporal range: Permian-Triassic

Trace fossil

Dimetropus is a synapsid ichnogenus commonly found in assemblages of ichnofossils dating to the Permian to Triassic in Europe and North America. Analysis of trackways of Dimetropus provides evidence that the tracks were left by diadectids or non-therapsid synapsids ("pelycosaurs").

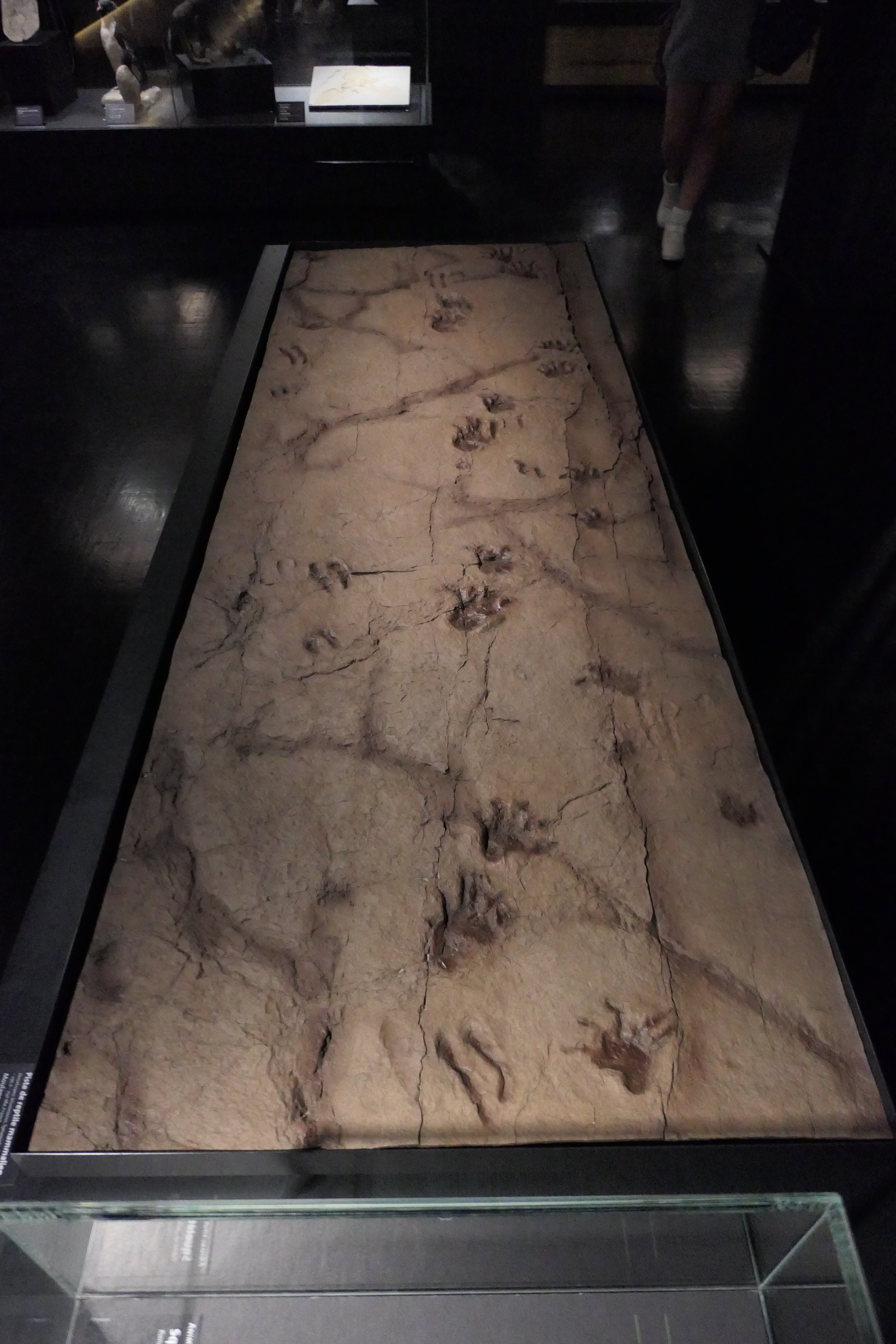
Orléans - MOBE 12
