= Trichasaurus =

Trichasaurus Temporal range: 279.5–272.5 Ma Kungurian

Scientific classification
- Domain: Eukaryota
- Kingdom: Animalia
- Phylum: Chordata
- Clade: Synapsida
- Clade: †Caseasauria
- Family: †Caseidae
- Genus: †Trichasaurus; Williston, 1913

Extinct genus of synapsids

Trichasaurus is an extinct genus of caseid synapsids.

== See also ==
- List of pelycosaurs
