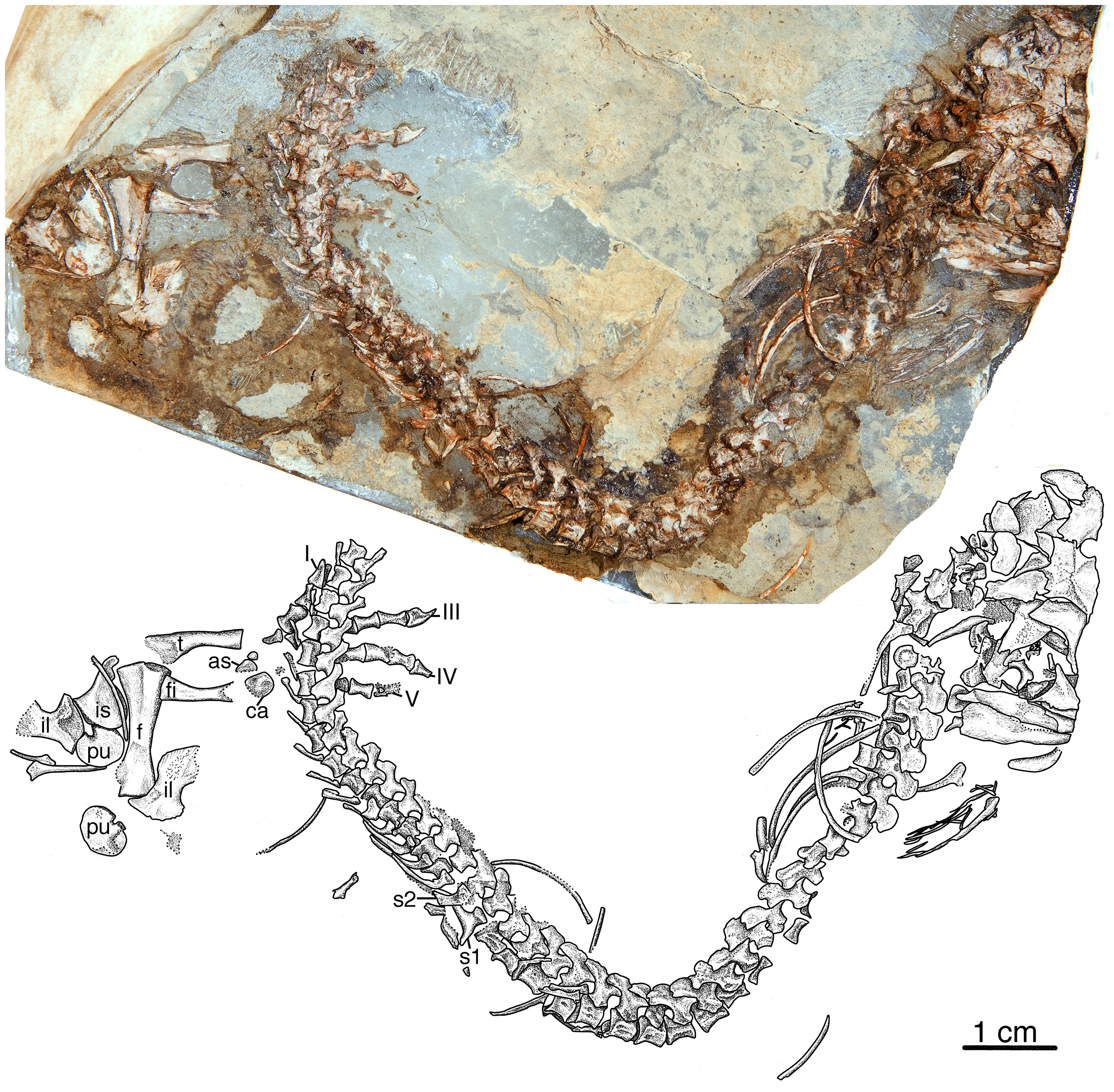
- Holotype fossil

Scientific classification
- Kingdom: Animalia
- Phylum: Chordata
- Clade: Synapsida
- Clade: †Caseasauria
- Family: †Caseidae
- Genus: †Eocasea; Reisz & Fröbisch, 2014

Type species
- †Eocasea martini Reisz & Fröbisch, 2014

= Eocasea =

Eocasea Temporal range: Late Carboniferous, 300 Ma

Extinct genus of synapsids

Eocasea is an extinct genus of caseid synapsids from the Late Pennsylvanian of Kansas. It is known from a single type species, Eocasea martini.

== Description ==
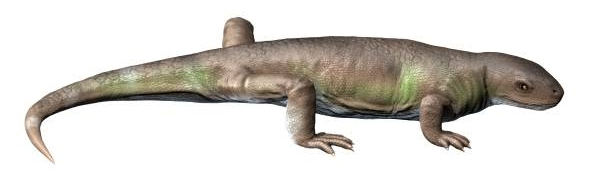
Life reconstruction of Eocasea martini

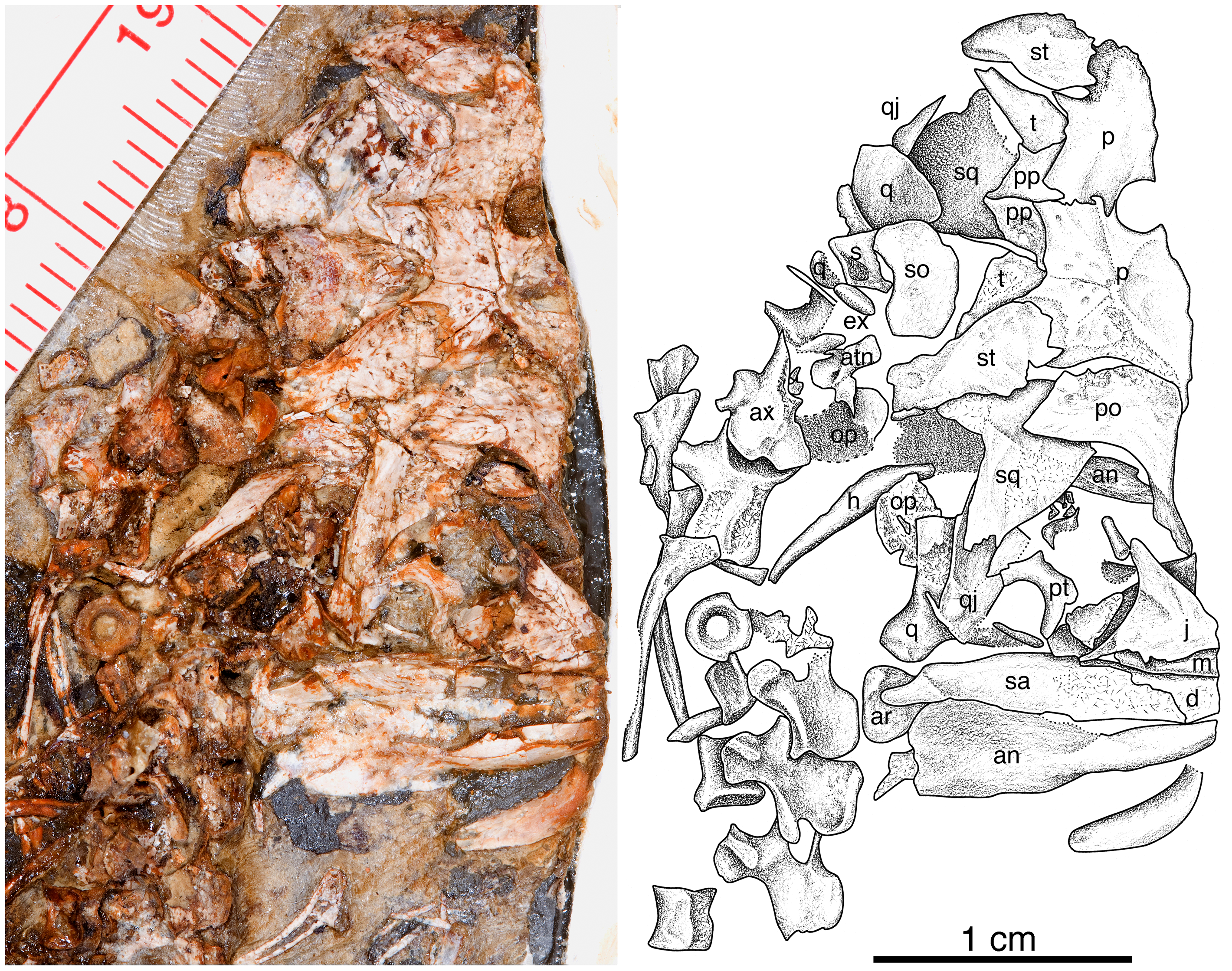
Skull

Eocasea is the oldest and most basal member of Caseidae, lacking many of the specialized anatomical features that characterize later members of the group. Caseids are notable for being one of the first groups of tetrapods to evolve herbivory; large-bodied taxa such as Casea and Cotylorhynchus have barrel-shaped rib cages and leaf-shaped, serrated teeth that are clear adaptations for breaking down plant cellulose. Eocasea differs from these taxa in having a narrow rib cage, simple cone-shaped teeth, and a much smaller body size. All of these are plesiomorphic features for synapsids, meaning that Eocasea inherited a carnivorous lifestyle from similarly small-bodied carnivorous ancestors of synapsids. As the earliest known caseid, Eocasea represents one of the first transitions from carnivory to herbivory in tetrapods.
