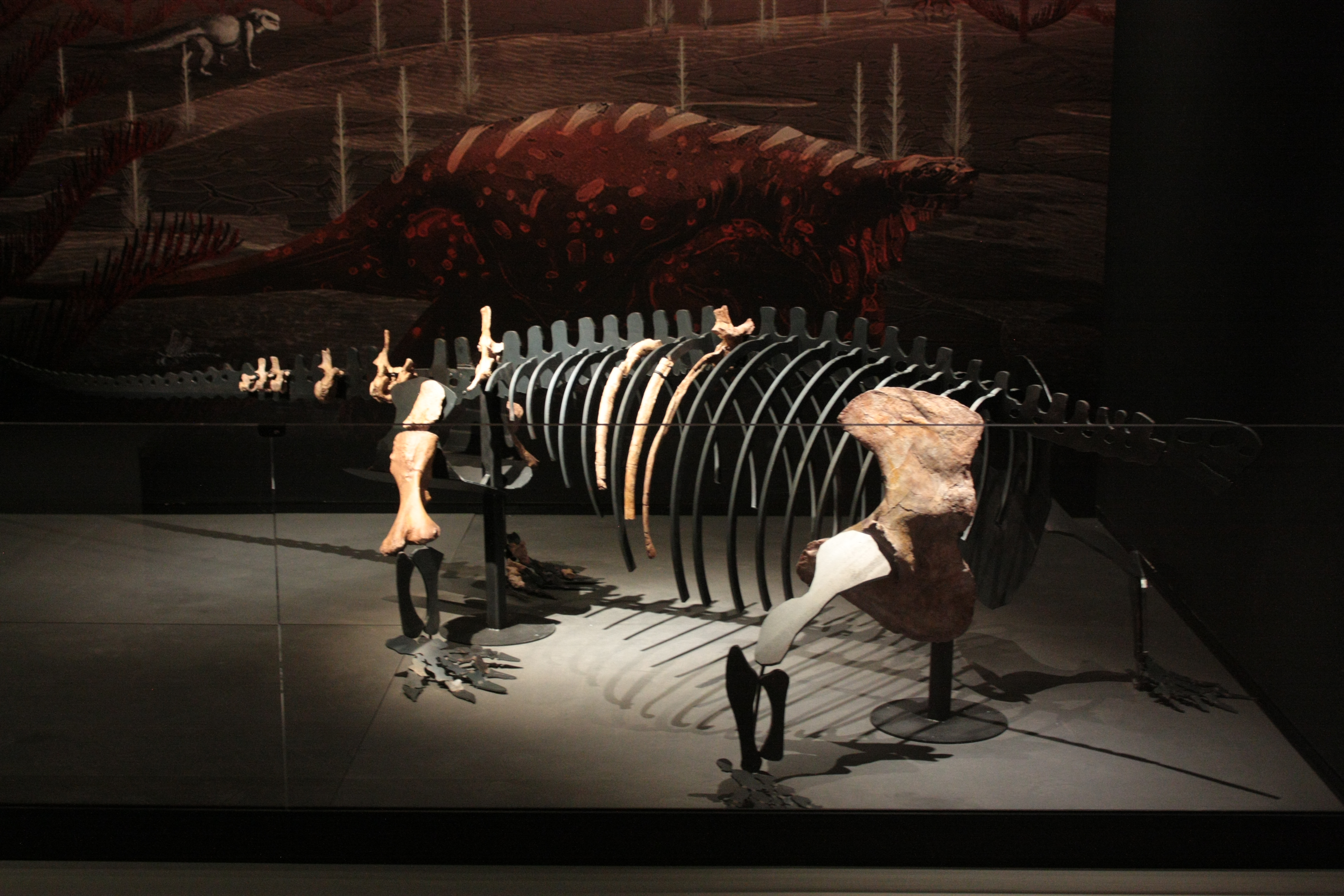
- Partial postcranial skeleton (cast) of Lalieudorhynchus gandi on display at the Musée de Lodève. The sacral vertebrae are not present here.

Scientific classification
- Kingdom: Animalia
- Phylum: Chordata
- Clade: Synapsida
- Clade: †Caseasauria
- Family: †Caseidae
- Genus: †Lalieudorhynchus; Werneburg et al., 2022

Species
- †Lalieudorhynchus gandi Werneburg et al., 2022 (type)

= Lalieudorhynchus =

Lalieudorhynchus Temporal range: Guadalupian Wordian–Capitanian

Extinct genus of synapsids

Lalieudorhynchus is an extinct genus of caseid synapsids that lived during the Guadalupian (= Middle Permian) in what is now Southern France. The genus is only known by its type species, Lalieudorhynchus gandi, which was named in 2022 by Ralf Werneburg, Frederik Spindler, Jocelyn Falconnet, Jean-Sébastien Steyer, Monique Vianey-Liaud, and Joerg W. Schneider. Lalieudorhynchus is represented by a partial postcranial skeleton discovered in the Lodève basin in the central part of the Hérault department in the Occitanie region. It belongs to an individual measuring approximately 3.75 m (12.3 ft) in length. The degree of ossification of its bones, however, indicates that it was a late juvenile or still growing young adult. Based on the internal structure of its bones, the describing authors interpreted Lalieudorhynchus as a semiaquatic animal that may have had a lifestyle similar to that of hippopotamus, spending part of its time in water but returning to land for food, though the idea that caseids were semi-aquatic has been previously contested by other authors. It is geologically one of the youngest known representatives of the caseids. The phylogenetic analysis proposed by Werneburg and colleagues identified Lalieudorhynchus as a derived caseid closely related to the North American species "Cotylorhynchus" hancocki.

== Etymology ==
The genus name is a combination of La Lieude located near the type locality, and "rhynchus", the Latinized form of the Greek "rhynchos" (the nose) sometimes used in the names of caseids. The specific epithet honours Georges Gand who worked on the Lodève basin for decades, notably on the La Lieude footprint slab, and co-organized and promoted the excavation campaigns for this caseid.

== Description ==
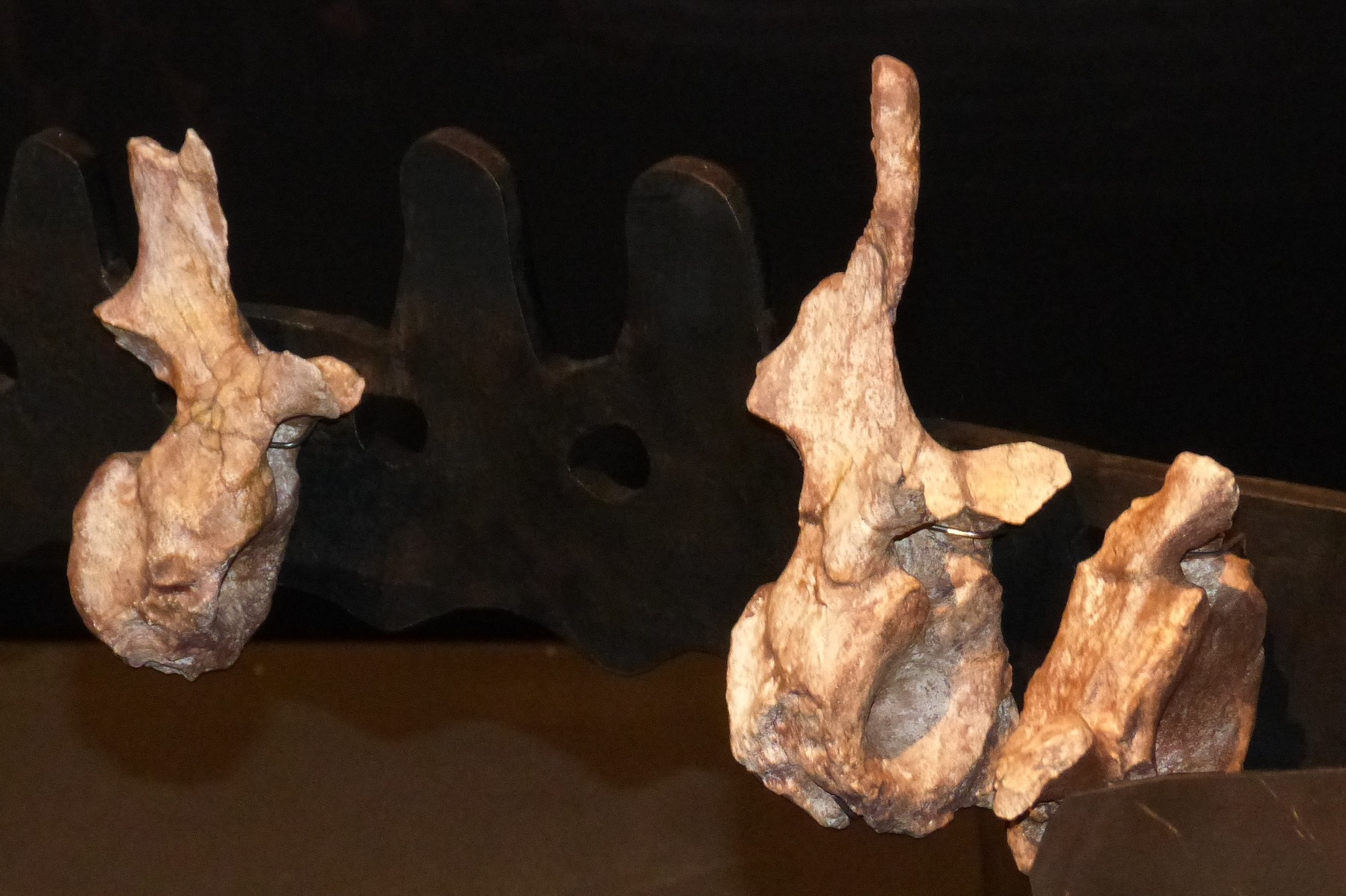
Caudal vertebrae (cast) of Lalieudorhynchus gandi in lateral view.

Lalieudorhynchus is represented by a partial and disarticulated but well-preserved post-cranial skeleton. The holotype, represented by a series of bones cataloged UM-LIE 02–37, UM-LIE 39–41, UM-LIE 45 and UM-LIE 47, consists of about ten vertebrae (dorsal, sacral and caudal), about fifteen ribs, a complete right scapulocoracoid 50 cm (20 in) long, the dorsal branch of the left ilium, the right and left femora measuring 35.5 cm (14.0 in) long, and several foot bones (an astragalus, two tarsal elements and five phalanges). The total body length of this specimen is estimated at 3.75 m (12.3 ft). The holotype of Lalieudorhynchus shows a mixture of mature and immature characters throughout its skeleton indicating that this specimen was a late juvenile or a still growing young adult at the time of its death. The skull is unknown, but like its closest relatives, it was probably very small compared to the size of the body, triangular-shaped in dorsal view, and terminating anteriorly in a forward-sloping snout with very large external nostrils. The shape of its ribs indicates that Lalieudorhynchus had a barrel-shaped rib cage like other derived caseids. This must have housed large digestive tract suggesting that the animal had to feed on a large quantity of plants with low nutritional value.

Lalieudorhynchus is characterized by several apomorphies. The neural spines of the sacral and anterior caudal vertebrae have a cross section with a very thin keel-like process forwards, which starting above the prezygapophyses and running upwards along the entire vertical edge to the top of the neural spine. The neural spines of the dorsal and caudal vertebrae have their dorsal end slender instead of showing lateral thickening. The first sacral rib has a narrow distal end. The scapulocoracoid has a fossa on the triceps process of the metacoracoid (one of the three bones forming the scapulocoracoid with the procoracoid and the scapula). The foot is characterized by a very large distal tarsus 1 of the same width as the astragalus, with almost all sides slightly concave.

Lalieudorhynchus is also distinguished by a unique combination of characters. Like other caseids, it differs from Ruthenosaurus by its straight neural spines instead of being angled forwards. The middle caudal vertebrae have relatively long centra, elongated below their postzygapophyses, but with low neural arches, unlike Alierasaurus. The three sacral vertebrae and the most anterior caudal vertebra have a short and transversely very wide centrum like in Ruthenosaurus, while these same centra are much narrower in Cotylorhynchus romeri. The neural spine of the first sacral and the first caudal vertebra is very elongated dorsally as in "Cotylorhynchus" hancocki, which is not the case in C. romeri and Ruthenosaurus. A hyposphene is present under the postzygapophyses of the dorsal and caudal vertebrae, a feature previously reported only in C. hancocki. A supraglenoid foramen is present, opening laterally in the supraglenoid fossa and medially in the dorsal part of the subscapular fossa as in "C." hancocki. The shaft of the scapular blade is much wider than that of Alierasaurus. The anteromedial border of the scapula is bulged by the presence of a slightly rounded scapular process, a feature shared with "C." hancocki, "C." bransoni and "Angelosaurus" romeri, but not with C. romeri and Alierasaurus. Two parts of the glenoid fossa have an angle of approximately 130° as in C. bransoni. The femur has a posterior condyle occupying a much more distal position than the anterior condyle, contrary to Ruthenosaurus. The popliteal area of the femur of Lalieudorhynchus is relatively wide with robust grooves, and is much larger and deeper than in C. romeri. The proximal head of the bone is more massive dorso-ventrally than in C. romeri. The femur also has a large pronounced internal trochanter and a little fourth trochanter in its distal half, a feature shared with "C." hancocki, Angelosaurus romeri and A. greeni, and which differs from C. romeri, Angelosaurus dolani, Casea broilii, and Ruthenosaurus. The intercondylar fossa of the femur is very wide, inferring a narrow postero-dorsal condyle, unlike C. romeri and Ruthenosaurus. The astragalus is nearly as broad as long in contrast to most other caseids, but is very similar to that of "C." hancocki. The metatarsal I is robust and enlarged like in Alierasaurus. The phalanges are short and wide. They are shorter than in Alierasaurus.

== Paleobiology ==
Rib bone histology of Lalieudorhynchus revealed a bone with a very spongy structure, an extremely thin cortex, and the absence of distinct medullary cavity. These characteristics, also reported in other large caseids such as Cotylorhynchus, would suggest a semiaquatic lifestyle. This hypothesis is however disputed by Kenneth Angielczyk and Christian Kammerer, as well as by Robert Reisz and colleagues based on paleontological and taphonomic data combined with the absence in these large caseids of morphological adaptations to an aquatic lifestyle. However, these authors do not yet provide alternative explanations for the internal bone structure of large caseids. Werneburg and colleagues think that Lalieudorhynchus and large caseids in general, could have had a semiaquatic lifestyle comparable to that of hippopotamuses, spending most of their time in water, practicing a kind of subaquatic walking rather than swimming, and possibly returning to land to feed on terrestrial plants. However, paleontologists don't know if Lalieudorhynchus fed on terrestrial and/or aquatic plants. Plant fossils associated with the skeleton of Lalieudorhynchus are identified as terrestrial forms adapted to a dry seasonal climate, while aquatic plants are not present. However, the latter are rarely preserved in Permian sites. Sedimentary analysis of the type locality of Lalieudorhynchus indicates the existence of several potential aquatic habitats. Partially silty claystone beds 15 cm (5.9 in) to 1.8 m (5.9 ft) thick come from suspended-sedimentation in a mass of stagnant water after heavy flooding. Some remains of aquatic arthropods adapted to temporary stagnant waters such as conchostracans and triopsids have been found in these levels. Another possible habitat are river channels reaching 3.5 m (11 ft) to 5 m (16 ft) deep in La Lieude Formation. The presence of rooting at several levels indicates that these channels must not have been filled with flowing water all year round because of the seasonal climate of the time. During the dry season, however, it is likely that masses of stagnant water may have existed in abandoned channels, lakes or ponds, allowing the survival of animals with a more aquatic lifestyle such as the tupilakosaurid dvinosaurs, of which one specimen was associated with the skeleton of Lalieudorhynchus.

== Discovery and taphonomy ==
The first remains of Lalieudorhynchus were discovered in 2001 by Joerg W. Schneider and Frank Körner in the Salagou stream during geological field mapping in the Lodève basin. Other elements were recovered during excavations carried out between 2004 and 2008 totaling about fifty bones. The size range of the bones indicates that they come from a single individual. The presence of bones of a single and same individual distributed sporadically in a sequence 1.4 m (4.6 ft) thick (with a concentration of bones in a bed of 40 cm (16 in) thick) within horizons with different lithology, could be explained by a decomposition of the carcass in a vegetated area (as suggested by abundant plant remains) alternately exposed and flooded. The bones seem to have been reworked and redeposited several times but over a very short distance and over a very short period of time because the bones are very well preserved. They do not show wear due to transport by water and are not fractured by prolonged exposure to a highly seasonal climate.

== Geographical and stratigraphical distribution ==
The holotype of Lalieudorhynchus comes from the upper part of the La Lieude Formation, in the Lodève basin located in Hérault department, in Occitanie region. The disarticulated skeleton was discovered in strata located approximately 140 m (460 ft) above the base of the formation (which reaches a total of 175 m (574 ft) in thickness). No radiometric dating is available for the La Lieude Formation. A Lopingian (= Upper Permian) age was assigned to it by insects biostratigraphy, radiometric ages and sedimentation rates calculated for the underlying Salagou Formation. Magnetostratigraphic and paleontological data most likely suggest a Guadalupian (= Middle Permian) age. Magnetostratigraphy indicates that the lower part of the La Lieude Formation is no younger than the Illawarra Reversal, a global geomagnetic event dated to the Middle Wordian 266.66 ± 0.76 million years ago. Therefore, this part of the formation would probably have a late Roadian – early Wordian age, while the upper part would have a minimum late Wordian – early Capitanian age. The presence in the lower part of the La Lieude Formation of the ichnogenus Brontopus also indicates a Guadalupian age. Originally discovered at La Lieude, Brontopus has since been found in the Abrahamskraal Formation in South Africa which is radiometrically dated to Wordian and Capitanian. The presumed producers of the Brontopus tracks, the dinocephalian therapsids, are also consistent with a Guadalupian age of the La Lieude Formation because the bones of these animals, discovered in Southern and eastern Africa as well as in Russia, China and Brazil, are exclusively known in Guadalupian deposits. The Wordian - Capitanian age of Lalieudorhynchus makes it one of the last known caseids. With the genera Ennatosaurus and Alierasaurus, it confirms the persistence of caseids during the Guadalupian at least in Europe.

== Paleoenvironments ==
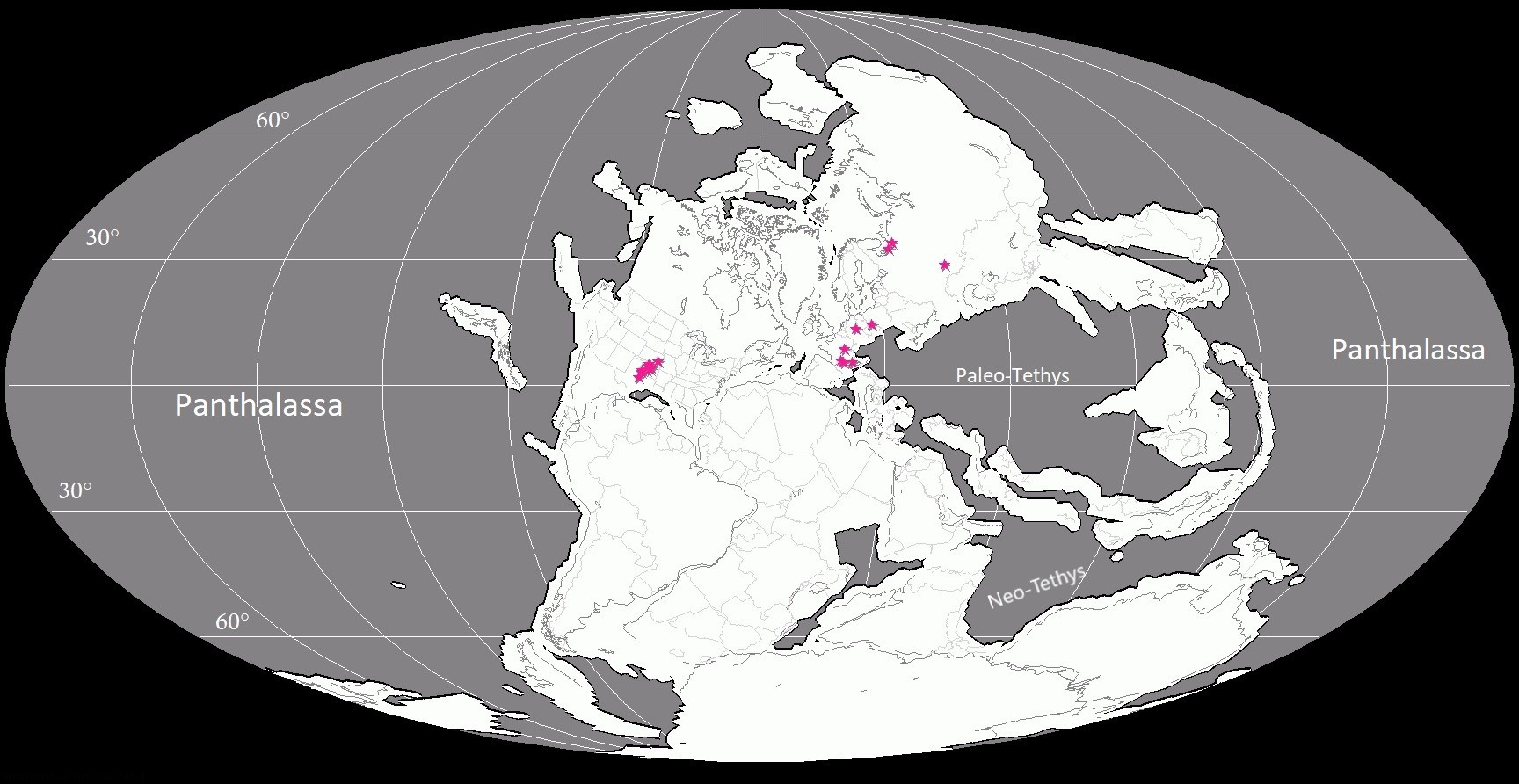
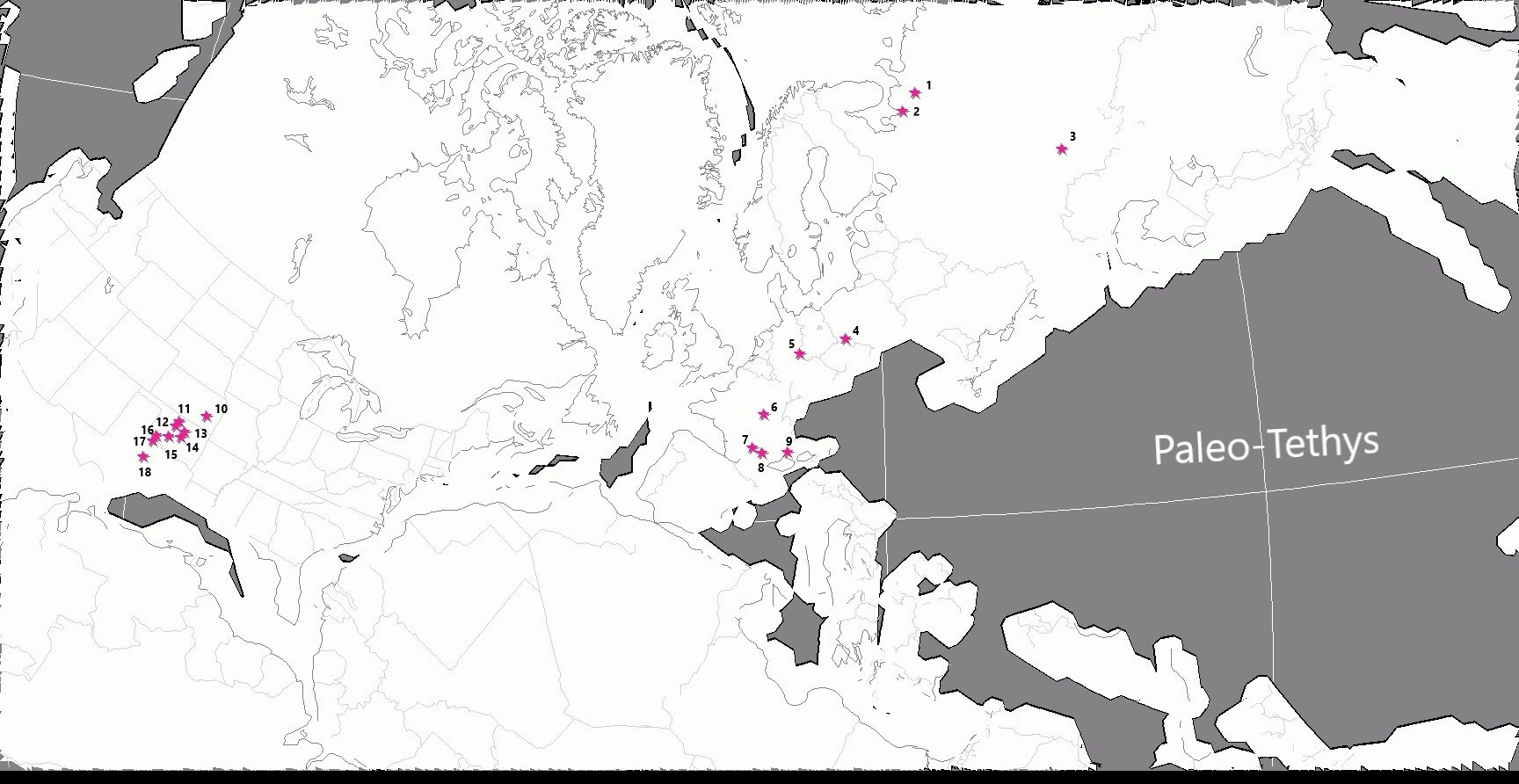
Left: paleogeographic map of Earth at the end of the Paleozoic showing the known distribution of caseid synapsids. Right: close-up of the paleogeographic location of the caseid sites. 1 and 2 Ennatosaurus tecton, Arkhangelsk Oblast, Russia, late Roadian – early Wordian; 3 Phreatophasma aenigmaticum, Bashkortostan, Russia, early Roadian; 4 Datheosaurus macrourus Lower Silesian Voivodeship, Poland, Gzhelian; 5 Martensius bromackerensis, Thuringia, Germany, Sakmarian; 6 Callibrachion gaudryi, Saône-et-Loire, France, Asselian; 7 Euromycter rutenus and Ruthenosaurus russellorum, Aveyron, France, late Artinskian; 8 Lalieudorhynchus gandi, Hérault, France, Wordian – early Capitanian; 9 Alierasaurus ronchii, Nurra, Sardinia, Italy, Roadian; 10 Eocasea martini, Greenwood County, Kansas, late Pennsylvanian; 11 Angelosaurus romeri and Cotylorhynchus bransoni, Kingfisher County, Oklahoma, early Roadian; 12 Cotylorhynchus bransoni, Blaine County, Oklahoma, early Roadian; 13 Cotylorhynchus romeri, Logan County, Oklahoma, mid-late Kungurian; 14 Cotylorhynchus romer, Cleveland County, Oklahoma, mid-late Kungurian; 15 Oromycter dolesorum and Arisierpeton simplex, Comanche County, Oklahoma, early Artinskian; 16 Cotylorhynchus hancocki, Hardeman County, Texas, late Kungurian – early Roadian; 17 Cotylorhynchus hancocki, Angelosaurus dolani, A. greeni, Caseoides sanangeloensis, and Caseopsis agilis, Knox County, Texas, late Kungurian – early Roadian; 18 Casea broilii, Baylor County, Texas, mid-late Kungurian.

In Guadalupian time, most of the landmasses were united in one supercontinent, Pangea. It was roughly C-shaped: its northern (Laurasia) and southern (Gondwana) parts were connected to the west, but separated to the east by the very large Tethys Sea. A long string of microcontinents, grouped under the name of Cimmeria, divided the Tethys in two : the Paleo-Tethys in the north, and the Neo-Tethys in the south. The Lodève basin was located in the equatorial belt of the time, at the level of the 10th parallel north, and in relation to the Tethys shores, was approximately 400 km inland. Hercynian mounts, with unknown topography, separated the Lodève basin from the Tethys. At that time, the very humid climate which usually characterizes the equatorial climate had been replaced by an extension of the drier tropical climate (with two seasons, dry and wet) toward the regions close to the equator.

The La Lieude Formation is represented by conglomerates, fine to coarse-grained, partly pebbly sandstones, red-brown, partly clayey or fine sandy siltstones, and intercalated silty claystones. These rocks correspond to sands, gravels, and pebbles carried by rivers, and to fluvial silts from floodplains, deposited in a braided river system. There are also several debris flow layers testifying the existence of very heavy rainfall during the wet season. Most of the bones of Lalieudorhynchus come from these debris flow horizons and some from mudflows. These debris flow deposits also contain abundant plant remains represented by numerous lanceolate leaves 5 to 11 cm (2.0 to 4.3 in) in length probably belonging to Plagiozamites, some remains of Podozamites-like coniferophytes, Supaia-like fragments, a few tree trunks up to 2 m (6.6 ft) long and 15 to 20 cm (5.9 to 7.9 in) wide, and smaller plant axes.

Apart from Lalieudorhynchus, the upper part of the Lieude Formation yielded only a vertebral column of a tupilakosaurid temnospondyl, freshwater arthropods (conchostracans and triopsids), insect wings (Odonata), and indeterminable footprints. Other elements of the fauna of the La Lieude Formation are present on the La Lieude slab, located towards the base of the formation, which exposes numerous tetrapod trackways. Many tetrapod ichnospecies (Note: The same ichnospecies may have been left by several closely related biological species that share a very similar manus and pes anatomy.) have been named from this site. The taxonomic and morphological review of these footprints distinguished four valid ichnospecies and identified their probable producers: Brontopus giganteus and B. antecursor, which very probably represents dinocephalian therapsids (respectively a Tapinocephalia and an Anteosauridae), Merifontichnus thalerius, which corresponds to footprints of a moradisaurin captorhinid eureptile, and Pachypes ollieri, which would belong to a pareiasauromorpha Nycteroleteridae.

== Phylogeny ==
Phylogenetic analysis by Wernebug and colleagues identified Lalieudorhynchus gandi as one of the most derived caseids and the sister taxon to the North American species "Cotylorhynchus" hancocki. These two taxa form a clade characterized by the presence of a hyposphene, as well as by the presence and position of the supraglenoid foramen. This clade forms with "Cotylorhynchus" bransoni an apical clade characterized by closely spaced postzygapophyses. This analysis also suggests that the genera Angelosaurus and Cotylorhynchus (each composed of three species) would be paraphyletic, taxa other than their type species may belong to different genera.

Below is the cladogram published by Werneburg and colleagues in 2022.

- Caseidae
  - Martensius bromackerensis
  - - - Oromycter dolesorum
      - - Casea
        - - "Casea" nicholsi
          - - Euromycter
            - - Ennatosaurus
              - - Angelosaurus dolani
                - "Angelosaurus" romeri
                - - - Ruthenosaurus
                    - Caseopsis
                  - Cotylorhynchus romeri
                  - - Alierasaurus
                    - - "Cotylorhynchus" bransoni
                      - - Lalieudorhynchus
                        - "Cotylorhynchus" hancocki

== See also ==
- List of synapsids
