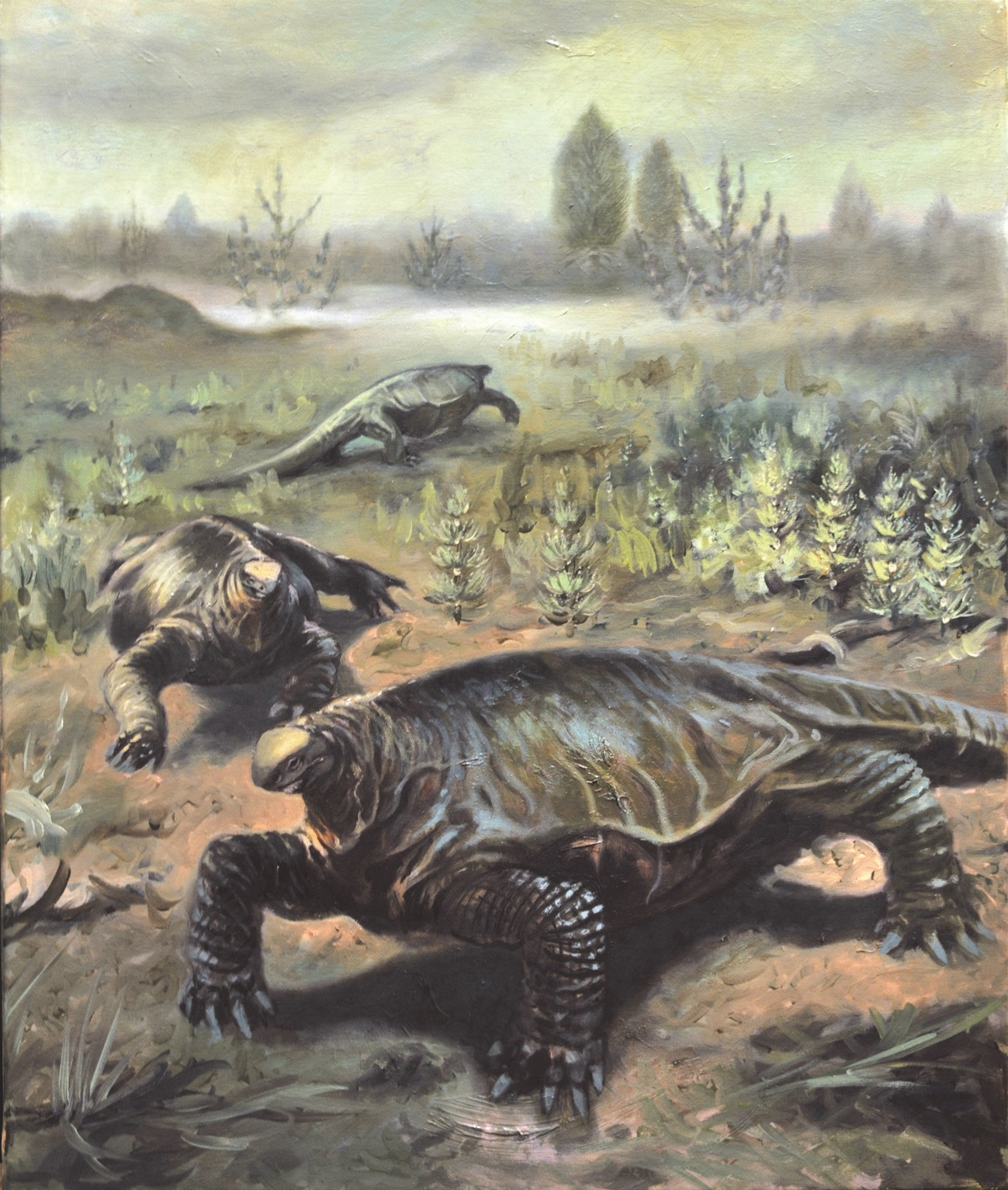
- Reconstruction of Alierasaurus by Emiliano Troco.

Scientific classification
- Kingdom: Animalia
- Phylum: Chordata
- Clade: Synapsida
- Clade: †Caseasauria
- Family: †Caseidae
- Genus: †Alierasaurus; Romano and Nicosia, 2014
- Species: †A. ronchii

Binomial name
- †Alierasaurus ronchii Romano and Nicosia, 2014

= Alierasaurus =

Alierasaurus Temporal range: early Middle Permian Roadian

Extinct genus of synapsids

Alierasaurus is an extinct genus of caseid synapsid that lived during the early Middle Permian (Roadian) in what is now Sardinia. It is represented by a single species, the type species Alierasaurus ronchii. Known from a very large partial skeleton found within the Cala del Vino Formation, Alierasaurus is one of the largest known caseids. It closely resembles Cotylorhynchus, another giant caseid from the San Angelo Formation in Texas. The dimensions of the preserved foot elements and caudal vertebrae suggest an estimated total length of about 6 or 7 m (20 or 23 ft) for Alierasaurus. In fact, the only anatomical features that differ between Alierasaurus and Cotylorhynchus are found in the bones of the feet; Alierasaurus has a longer and thinner fourth metatarsal and it has ungual bones at the tips of the toes that are pointed and claw-like rather than flattened as in other caseids. Alierasaurus and Cotylorhynchus both have very wide, barrel-shaped rib cages indicating that they were herbivores that fed primarily on high-fiber plant material.

== Etymology ==
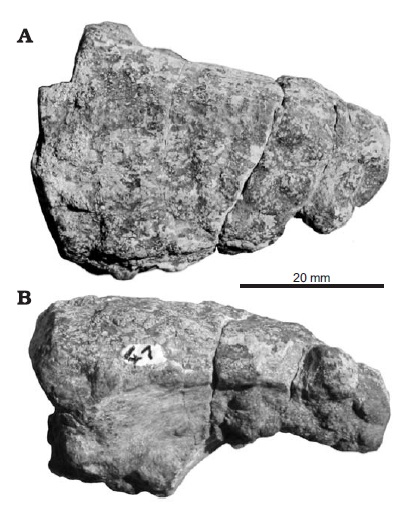
Ungual phalanx (which supported a horny claw) of Alierasaurus ronchii in dorsal and right lateral views

The generic name refers to Aliera, the name in local dialect of the town of Alghero, and saurus, meaning lizard. The specific name is in honor of Ausonio Ronchi, the discoverer of the specimen.

== Description ==
The paleontologists Marco Romano and Umberto Nicosia have identified several autapomorphies in the feet anatomy of Alierasaurus: metatarsal IV with distinct axial region, length about twice that of the corresponding proximal phalanx, not short and massive as in other large caseids; metatarsal IV proximal head not orthogonal to the bone axis, forming an angle of 120° with the shaft: with this conformation, the proximal and distal heads are much closer along the medial side of the metatarsal; claw-shaped ungual phalanges proportionally shorter than in Cotylorhynchus, with a double ventral flexor tubercle very close to the proximal rim of the phalanx; ungual phalangeal axis bent downward and medially; distal transverse section subtriangular, not spatulate as in Cotylorhynchus.

== Discovery ==
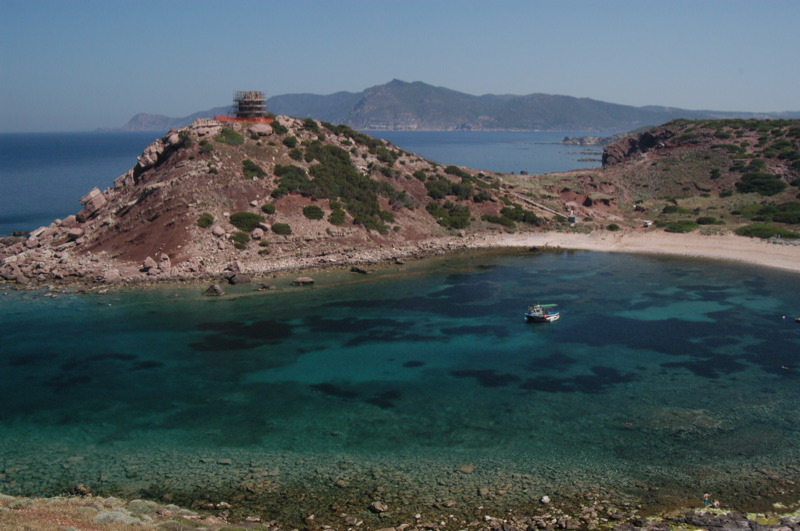
The Torre del Porticciolo promontory, where the remains of Alierasaurus were discovered

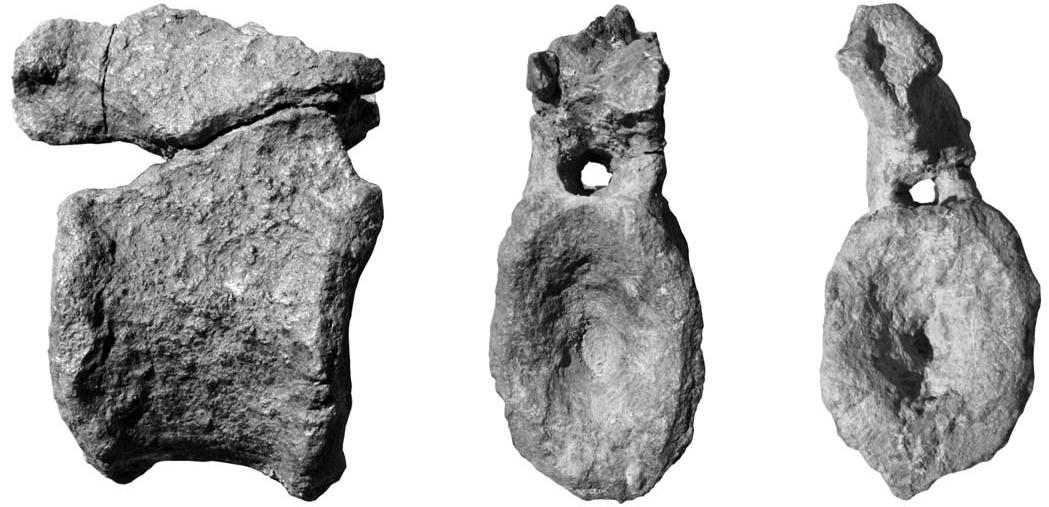
Caudal vertebra of Alierasaurus ronchii in lateral, anterior and posterior views

The holotype of Alierasaurus was discovered in the uppermost levels of the Permian Cala del Vino Formation, on top of the Torre del Porticciolo promontory, which separates the Porticciolo Gulf from the northern coast (near the town of Alghero, Nurra, northwest Sardinia). Some bones were found loose on the ground surface, and others still embedded in mudstone-siltstone layer. These sediments were deposited in a former alluvial plain under a relatively mild semi-arid climate. The known material consist of eight articulated caudal vertebrae, two isolated caudal vertebrae, four distal caudal centra, numerous large fragments referable to at least eight other vertebrae, seven proximal portions of hemal arches, three proximal portions (vertebral segment) of dorsal ribs, ten undetermined fragmentary ribs, poorly preserved right scapula and badly crushed right coracoid plate, distal head of the left ulna, and several autopodial elements represented by a fragmentary calcaneum, three metapodials, five non-ungual phalanges, an almost complete ungual phalanx, and two ungual phalanges lacking distal ends. These remains were firstly regarded as belonging possibly to Cotylorhynchus (cf Cotylorhynchus sp. in the publication of Ronchi et al.) or to a closely related taxon. Later, despite the absence of the most diagnostic elements (notably the skull) for the comparison with other caseids in general and with Cotylorhynchus in peculiar, the Sardinian specimen was assigned to a new genus named Alierasaurus, on the basis of some differences in feet anatomy. In 2017, Marco Romano and colleagues described other bones belonging to the same individual (some caudal vertebrae and fragments of chevrons and ribs). More recently, the same levels have yielded remains of an undescribed sphenacodontid pelycosaur, and footprints of a third animal which was only known in the south of France in slightly younger rocks (ichnogenus Merifontichnus from the La Lieude Formation (Wordian) in the Lodève basin).

== Taphonomy ==
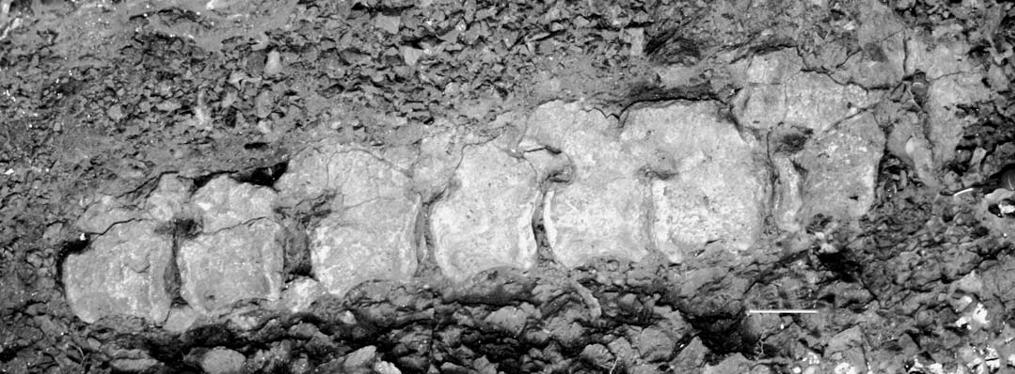
Articulated caudal vertebrae of Alierasaurus ronchii in situ

Remains of Alierasaurus were discovered grouped together on an area of a few square meters. Some lay on the ground, exposed by erosion, while others were still in the sediment. Most of the bones were isolated except for two foot bones and 8 caudal vertebrae found articulated. The bones still in place in the rock were not all on the same bedding plane but were buried at different depths within a 40 cm thick red siltstone layer. Several bones were fractured before burial. The taphonomy of the site indicates a complex burial process in several phases. Shortly after the death of the animal, the carcass was transported from the death place to a second burial place. This short transport was violent enough to break some bones. Subsequently, the corpse, still on the surface of the sediments, underwent a further rather short phase of decomposition before a new flash flood packed all the remains into a large amount of fine-grained sediment, transported them, and finally deposited them all together in a third place close to the previous one. This third phase of deposition explains why the bones are found at different depths in the sedimentary layer.

== Paleogeography ==
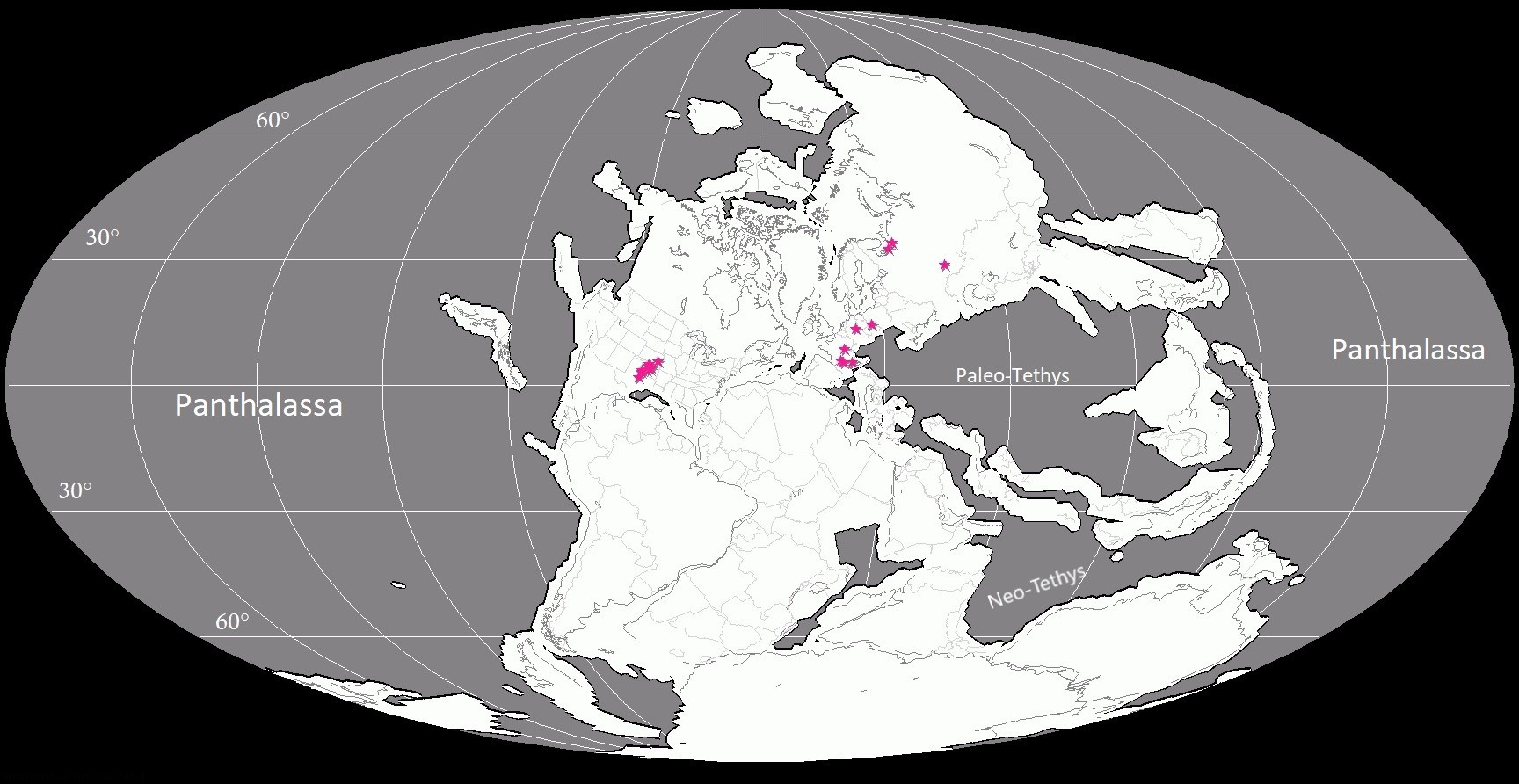
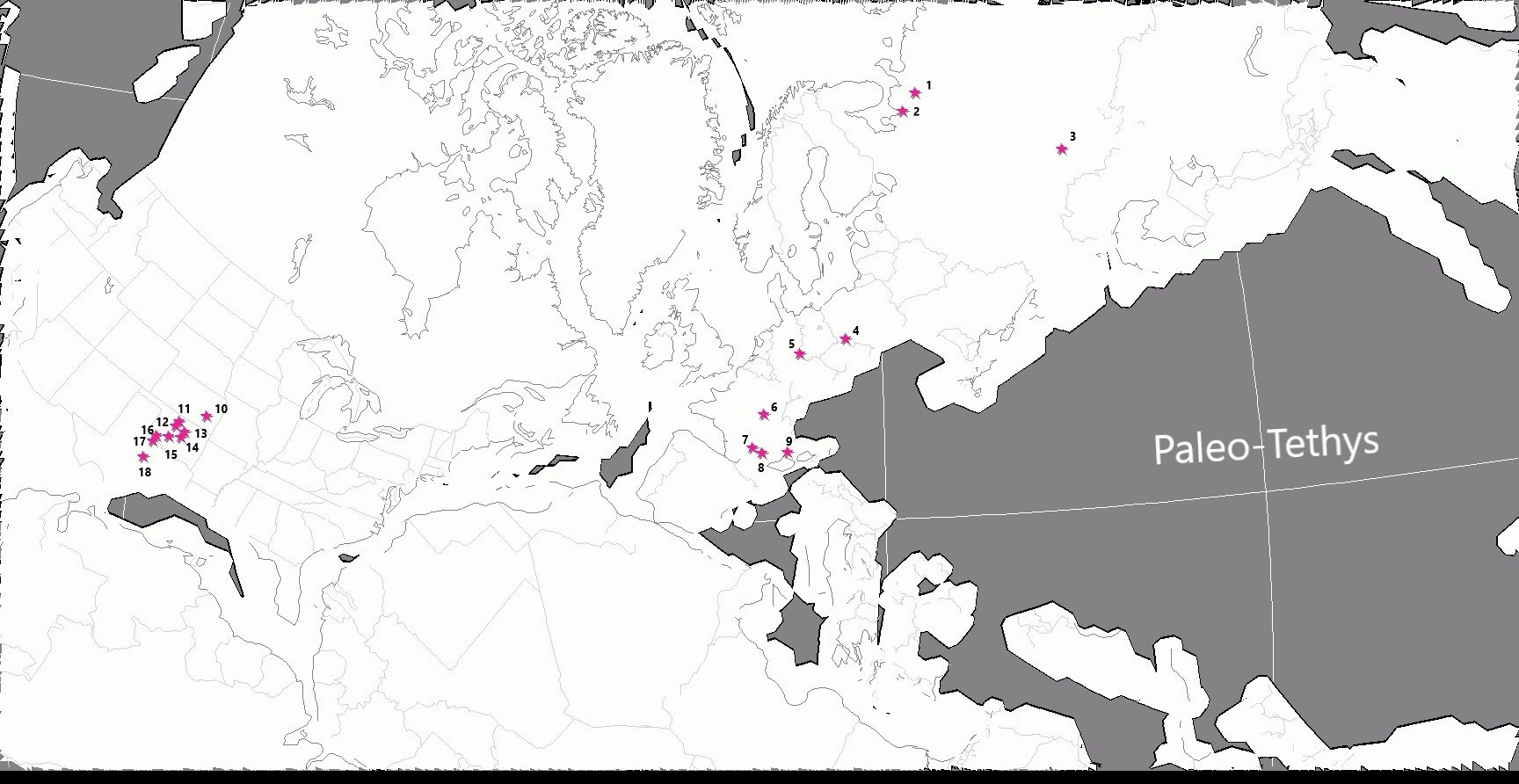
Left: paleogeographic map of Earth at the end of the Paleozoic showing the known distribution of caseid synapsids. Right: close-up of the paleogeographic location of the caseid sites. 1 and 2 Ennatosaurus tecton, Arkhangelsk Oblast, Russia, late Roadian – early Wordian; 3 Phreatophasma aenigmaticum, Bashkortostan, Russia, early Roadian; 4 Datheosaurus macrourus Lower Silesian Voivodeship, Poland, Gzhelian; 5 Martensius bromackerensis, Thuringia, Germany, Sakmarian; 6 Callibrachion gaudryi, Saône-et-Loire, France, Asselian; 7 Euromycter rutenus and Ruthenosaurus russellorum, Aveyron, France, late Artinskian; 8 Lalieudorhynchus gandi, Hérault, France, Wordian – early Capitanian; 9 Alierasaurus ronchii, Nurra, Sardinia, Italy, Roadian; 10 Eocasea martini, Greenwood County, Kansas, late Pennsylvanian; 11 Angelosaurus romeri and Cotylorhynchus bransoni, Kingfisher County, Oklahoma, early Roadian; 12 Cotylorhynchus bransoni, Blaine County, Oklahoma, early Roadian; 13 Cotylorhynchus romeri, Logan County, Oklahoma, mid-late Kungurian; 14 Cotylorhynchus romeri, Cleveland County, Oklahoma, mid-late Kungurian; 15 Oromycter dolesorum and Arisierpeton simplex, Comanche County, Oklahoma, early Artinskian; 16 Cotylorhynchus hancocki, Hardeman County, Texas, late Kungurian – early Roadian; 17 Cotylorhynchus hancocki, Angelosaurus dolani, A. greeni, Caseoides sanangeloensis, and Caseopsis agilis, Knox County, Texas, late Kungurian – early Roadian; 18 Casea broilii, Baylor County, Texas, mid-late Kungurian.

In Guadalupian time, most of the landmasses were united in one supercontinent, Pangea. It was roughly C-shaped: its northern (Laurasia) and southern (Gondwana) parts were connected to the west, but separated to the east by the very large Tethys Sea. A long string of microcontinents, grouped under the name Cimmeria, divided the Tethys in two: the Paleo-Tethys in the north, and the Neo-Tethys in the south. Sardinia was located in the equatorial belt of the time, at the level of the 10th parallel north. It was not an island at all and was part of Pangea. At that time, Sardinia (and Corsica) was connected to what is now southeastern France. The precise paleoposition of the Sardinia-Corsica block was determined in the early 2000s from detailed lithostratigraphic correlations between the Permian and Triassic successions of the Nurra region in northwestern Sardinia and the Toulon-Cuers Basin in Var department (where the Saint-Mandrier Formation is equivalent to the Cala del Vino Formation). The remarkable lithological similarities of the Nurra region with that of Toulon-Cuers Basin indicate that the two regions were initially closely faced each other and were parts of the same basin. (Note: It was not until the Oligocene that the Sardinia-Corsica block began to separate from what is now southeastern France (Durand, 2008).) The Sardinia-Corsica block was rotated 60° clockwise from its current orientation. The south of Sardinia was then located near the east of the Pyrenees (whose mountains did not yet exist), and the north-west of Corsica was positioned in front of the Massif de l'Esterel (the rhyolites of the Scandola peninsula aligning with those of the Esterel, of similar age and composition).

== Stratigraphic range ==
No radiometric dating is available for the Cala del Vino formation. Its age estimates range from late Kungurian to early Capitanian. These ages are inferred on the basis of direct and indirect stratigraphic correlations with the Permian basins of Provence (including the Toulon-Cuers basin which constituted a single sedimentary basin with the Nurra region) and coupled with paleontological data from Provence and Occitania. The Cala del Vino Formation is lithostratigraphically correlated with the Saint-Mandrier Formation of the Toulon-Cuers basin. The Saint-Mandrier Formation has not yet yielded any fossils, but it probably dates from the Guadalupian because it locally overlies lacustrine limestones and black mudstones of the Bau Rouge Member of the Les Salettes Formation which have yielded macroflora and microflora, respectively, suggesting a late Kungurian - early Roadian age. The lower part of the Saint-Mandrier Formation is correlated with the Les Pradineaux Formation of the Esterel basin in Provence. This formation overlies, above an unconformity, a rhyolitic formation (the A7 Rhyolite) dated at 272.5 ± 0.3 Ma. This absolute age, formerly considered as late Kungurian, corresponds now to the early Roadian. On the other hand, the Les Pradineaux Formation contains in its lower part the A11 Rhyolite which itself is undated but which is crossed by a fluorite-barite vein with adularia dated at 264 ± 2 Ma corresponding to the Capitanian, indicating an older age for the A11 Rhyolite and the Les Pradineaux Formation. Marc Durand suggests a Wordian age, the erosional gap at the top of the A7 Rhyolite corresponding according to him to a large part of the Roadian. The Les Pradineaux Formation has, however, yielded plants and pollens suggesting a Roadian age, an ostracod fauna indicative of a late Roadian age, and vertebrate tracks including the ichnogenus Brontopus characteristic of the Guadalupian. From these stratigraphic correlations, the Sardinian Cala del Vino Formation could thus be dated to the Roadian - Wordian. According to Werneburg and colleagues the age of the Cala del Vino formation could also extend from the Roadian to the early Capitanian like the La Lieude Formation of the Lodève basin, due to sedimentological similarities and the co-occurrence in the two formations of the caseids synapsids and the ichnogenus Merifontichnus.

== Phylogeny ==
In 2017 Marco Romano and colleagues published the first phylogenetic analysis including the genus Alierasaurus. It is recovered as the sister taxon of the genus Cotylorhynchus.

Below the cladogram published by Romano and colleagues in 2017.

- Caseasauria
  - Eothyris parkeyi
  - Caseidae
    - Oromycter dolesorum
    - - Casea broilii
      - - Euromycter rutenus
        - - - Caseoides sanangeloensis
            - - Caseopsis agilis
              - "Casea" nicholsi
          - - - Ennatosaurus tecton
              - - Angelosaurus greeni
                - Angelosaurus romeri
            - - - Alierasaurus ronchii
                - - Cotylorhynchus bransoni
                  - - Cotylorhynchus hancocki
                    - Cotylorhynchus romeri

In describing the genus Martensius in 2020, Berman and colleagues published two cladograms. In the first, the position of caseids more derived than Martensius is poorly resolved. Alierasaurus forms a polytomy with Angelosaurus romeri and the three species of Cotylorhynchus. In the second cladogram, Alierasaurus is positioned above the genus Angelosaurus and forms a polytomy with Cotylorhynchus romeri and a clade containing the species C. bransoni and C. hancocki.

Below the two cladograms published by Berman and colleagues in 2020.

- Caseidae
  - Eocasea martini
  - - - Martensius bromackerensis
      - - Casea broilii
        - Oromycter dolesorum
        - Trichasaurus texensis
        - Casea nicholsi
        - Euromycter rutenus
        - - Ennatosaurus tecton
          - - Angelosaurus romeri
            - Alierasaurus ronchii
            - Cotylorhynchus romeri
            - Cotylorhynchus bransoni
            - Cotylorhynchus hancocki

- Caseidae
  - Eocasea martini
  - - - Martensius bromackerensis
      - - Casea broilii
        - - Oromycter dolesorum
          - Trichasaurus texensis
          - - Casea nicholsi
            - - Euromycter rutenus
              - - Ennatosaurus tecton
                - - Angelosaurus romeri
                  - - Alierasaurus ronchii
                    - Cotylorhynchus romeri
                    - - Cotylorhynchus bransoni
                      - Cotylorhynchus hancocki

In 2022, Werneburg and colleagues described the genus Lalieudorhynchus and published a phylogenetic analysis which concluded that Angelosaurus and Cotylorhynchus would be paraphyletic, both genera being possibly represented only by their type species. In this analysis, Cotylorhynchus romeri is positioned just above the genus Angelosaurus, and forms a polytomy with a clade containing Ruthenosaurus and Caseopsis and another clade containing Alierasaurus, the other two species of Cotylorhynchus and Lalieudorhynchus. Within the latter clade, Alierasaurus is the sister group of "Cotylorhynchus" bransoni and a more derived clade including Lalieudorhynchus and "Cotylorhynchus" hancocki.

Below is the cladogram published by Werneburg and colleagues in 2022.

- Caseidae
  - Martensius bromackerensis
  - - - Oromycter dolesorum
      - - Casea
        - - "Casea" nicholsi
          - - Euromycter
            - - Ennatosaurus
              - - Angelosaurus dolani
                - "Angelosaurus" romeri
                - - - Ruthenosaurus
                    - Caseopsis
                  - Cotylorhynchus romeri
                  - - Alierasaurus
                    - - "Cotylorhynchus" bransoni
                      - - Lalieudorhynchus
                        - "Cotylorhynchus" hancocki
