= Ruthenosaurus =

Ruthenosaurus Temporal range: Cisuralian (late Artinskian), ~ 285 Ma

Scientific classification
- Kingdom: Animalia
- Phylum: Chordata
- Clade: Synapsida
- Clade: †Caseasauria
- Family: †Caseidae
- Genus: †Ruthenosaurus; Reisz et al., 2011

Species
- †R. russellorum Reisz et al., 2011 (type)

Extinct genus of synapsids

Ruthenosaurus is an extinct genus of caseid synapsids that lived in what is now Southern France during the Early Permian (late Artinskian) about 285 million years ago. It is known from the holotype MNHN.F.MCL-1 an articulated partial postcranial skeleton. It was collected by D. Sigogneau-Russell and D. Russell in 1970 in the upper part of the M2 Member, Grès Rouge Group, in the Rodez Basin, near the village of Valady (département of Aveyron), in Occitanie Region. It was first named by Robert R. Reisz, Hillary C. Maddin, Jörg Fröbisch and Jocelyn Falconnet in 2011, and the type species is Ruthenosaurus russellorum.

== Etymology ==
Ruthenosaurus is named after a Gallic regional tribe, Ruthenie (in Medieval Latin), that have also given Ruthénois, the name of the inhabitants of the town of Rodez; and the Ancient Greek sauros, "lizard". The type species is named in honour of Drs Denise Sigogneau-Russell and Donald E. Russell, the original collectors of the holotype.

== Discovery ==
The holotype of Ruthenosaurus was discovered in the summer 1970 by the paleontologists Denise Sigogneau-Russell and Donald Eugene Russell, during a prospecting survey carried out in Permian red sandstones outcropping in badlands on the western flank of the Cayla Hill near the commune of Valady, northwest of Rodez. An eroded vertebra picked up on the western slope of the hill led the scientists to explore the surrounding canyons, where they discovered a large articulated skeleton still in place in the sediments but damaged by erosion. The skull, neck, most of the limbs, and the tail were missing, probably destroyed by erosion. The known material includes ribs and vertebrae of 18 presacrals, three sacrals, and 12 anterior caudals; incomplete scapulocoracoids and interclavicule; right humerus badly crushed and damaged; left humerus in two pieces, shaft damaged, but proximal and distal heads well preserved; complete left ulna and nearly complete radius; complete right femur, complete right tibia, and proximal portion of right fibula; and the complete right pelvis overlain by vertebral column. On the southeastern flank of the same hill, but in older strata, the same team discovered the anterior part of a skeleton (including the skull) belonging to a smaller animal. This specimen was first assigned to a new species of the genus Casea, Casea rutena. But it is now regarded as a distinct genus named Euromycter, with the new combination Euromycter rutenus. The larger skeleton, found stratigraphycally 120 meters above the Euromycter level, remained largely unprepared until 2003. The few overlapping elements with Euromycter suggested that it belongs to a different taxon named Ruthenosaurus russellorum in 2011.

== Description ==
Ruthenosaurus is diagnosed by several autapomorphies including dorsal vertebrae with anteriorly tilting neural spines and a diamond-shaped outline in transverse section; a first sacral rib with robust distal head, twice that of the second sacral rib; and a short iliac blade with prominent posterior process. It can be distinguished from Euromycter, from older deposits of the same locality, by the shape of the distal part of the humerus, including an ectepicondylar notch rather than a fully enclosed foramen, the specific shape of the ulna, and the overall robustness of the specimen.

The lack of fusion of the neural arches with their respective vertebral centra and incomplete ossification of the ends of the limb elements, including the absence of an ossified olecranon on the ulna, show clearly that this specimen represents a juvenile individual. However, it is distinctly larger than the fully mature specimen of Euromycter, suggesting a very large size for adult Ruthenosaurus.

== Stratigraphic range ==
The holotype of Ruthenosaurus was found in the uppert part of the red pelitic beds of the M2 Member, which belongs to the Grès Rouge (“Red Sandstone”) Group, a sedimentary sequence subdivided into five hectometric members (M1 to M5) localized in the western Rodez basin. Like the M1 Member that has yielded Euromycter, the deposits of the M2 Member are interpreted as a playa-lake environment (or Sabkha) under a semi-arid, hot climate. The age of the Grès Rouge Group is uncertain but it is regarded as contemporaneous to the Saxonian Group of the neighbouring Lodève basin, where radiometric and magnetostratigraphic data suggested previously an age between the late Sakmarian (middle of the Early Permian) and the early Lopingian (early Late Permian). However, new chronostratigraphic and magnetostratigraphic data for the Saxonian Group indicate an age between the Artinskian (for the Rabejac Formation and the Octon Member of the Salagou Formation) and the late Roadian-Wordian and possibly early Capitanian (for La Lieude Formation). A more precise stratigraphic correlation of the Permian Rodez basin with that of Lodève was proposed in 2022 by Werneburg and colleagues. In the Rodez basin, the FII Formation of the Salabru Group, underlying the Grès Rouge Group, yielded palynomorphs, conchostracans, and a tetrapod footprints assemblage equivalent to that of the Viala Formation of the Lodève basin. The lower part of the Viala Formation yielded a radiometric age of 290.96 ± 0.19 Ma corresponding to the late Sakmarian. It has also been determined that the M1 and M2 megasequences of the Rodez basin are equivalent to the Rabéjac Formation of the Lodève basin (and also of the Combret Member of the Saint-Pierre Formation of the Saint-Affrique basin in southern Aveyron). Above the Rabéjac Formation, the lower two-thirds of the Octon Member of the Salagou Formation yielded four tuff horizons radiometrically dated. The oldest tuff horizon provided an age of 284.40 ± 0.07 Ma corresponding to the latest Artinskian. Based on this dating, the Rabéjac Formation and the correlative M1 and M2 megasequences of the Grès Rouge Group can be dated to the late Artinskian. A conclusion consistent with the magnetostratigraphy which suggests that the entire Grès Rouge Group (members M1 to M5) would have an age between the late Artinskian and the early Wordian.

== Classification ==
The first phylogenetic analysis of the caseids containing Ruthenosaurus was made by Romano & Nicosia in 2015. In their most parsimonious analysis including nearly all caseids (to the exclusion of the very fragmentary Alierasaurus ronchi from Sardinia), Ruthenosaurus is found very close to Cotylorhynchus and most specifically to the giant Cotylorhynchus hancocki. However, Romano & Nicosia have concluded that given the large body size of the two taxa and considering the absence of cranial material for Ruthenosaurus, it is possible that their close similarity is size related.

Below the most parsimonious phylogenetic analysis published by Romano & Nicosia in 2015.

- Caseasauria
  - Eothyris parkeyi
  - Caseidae
    - Oromycter dolesorum
    - - Casea broilii
      - - Euromycter rutenus
        - - - Caseoides sanangeloensis
            - - “Casea” nicholsi
              - Caseopsis agilis
          - - - Cotylorhynchus bransoni
              - - Cotylorhynchus romeri
                - - Cotylorhynchus hancocki
                  - Ruthenosaurus russellorum
            - - Angelosaurus romeri
              - - Angelosaurus dolani
                - Ennatosaurus tecton

A phylogenetic analysis published in 2022 by Werneburg and colleagues suggests a possible close relationship between Ruthenosaurus and Caseopsis. Ruthenosaurus is also recovered as the sister taxon to a clade containing the genera Alierasaurus, Cotylorhynchus and Lalieudorhynchus.

Below is the cladogram published by Werneburg and colleagues in 2022.

- Caseidae
  - Martensius bromackerensis
  - - - Oromycter dolesorum
      - - Casea
        - - “Casea” nicholsi
          - - Euromycter
            - - Ennatosaurus
              - - Angelosaurus dolani
                - “Angelosaurus” romeri
                - - - Ruthenosaurus
                    - Caseopsis
                  - Cotylorhynchus romeri
                  - - Alierasaurus
                    - - “Cotylorhynchus” bransoni
                      - - Lalieudorhynchus
                        - “Cotylorhynchus” hancocki
