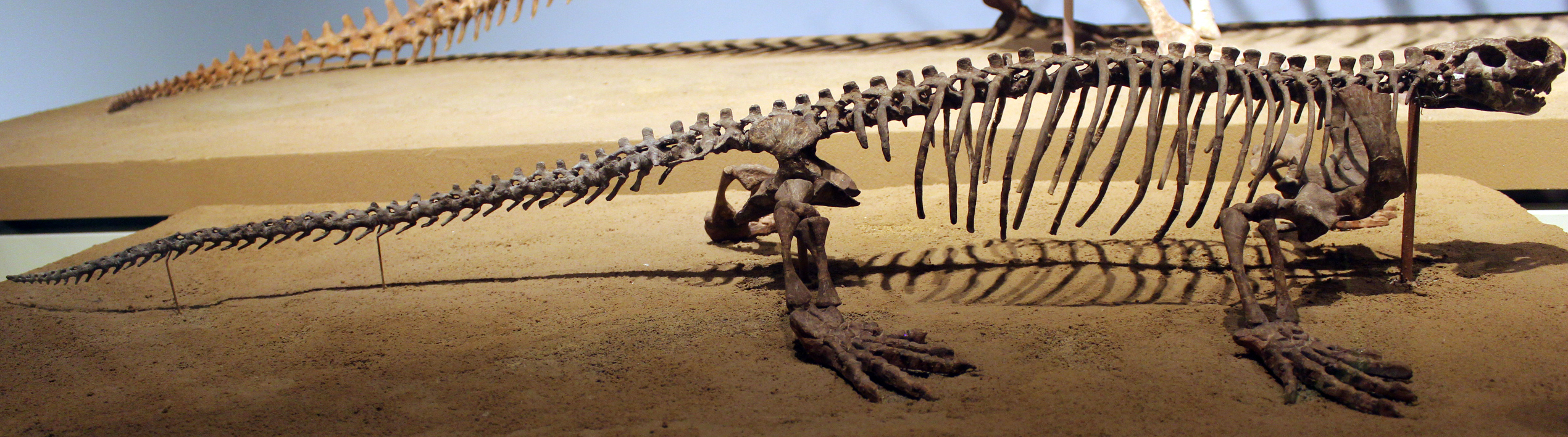
- C. broilii skeleton in the Field Museum of Natural History

Scientific classification
- Kingdom: Animalia
- Phylum: Chordata
- Clade: Synapsida
- Clade: †Caseasauria
- Family: †Caseidae
- Genus: †Casea; Williston, 1910

Type species
- Casea broilii Williston, 1910

= Casea =

Casea Temporal range: Early Permian, Kungurian

Extinct genus of synapsids

Casea is a genus of herbivorous caseid synapsids that lived during the late Lower Permian (Kungurian) in what is now Texas, United States. The genus is only represented by its type species, Casea broilii, named by Samuel Wendell Williston in 1910. The species is represented by a skull associated with a skeleton (the holotype FMNH UC 656), a second skull (FMNH UC 698), a partial skull with a better preserved dentition than that of the preceding skulls (FMNH UC 1011), and several incomplete postcranial skeletons. Three other Casea species were later erected, but these are considered today to be invalid or belonging to different genera. Casea was a small animal with a length of about 1.20 m and a weight of around 20 kg.

== Etymology ==
The genus name and specific epithet honor paleontologists Ermine C. Case and Ferdinand Broili.

== Description ==
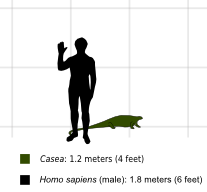
Size relative to a human

=== Skull ===
The skull, relatively small compared to the size of the body, shows the typical morphology of the caseids with a snout tilted forward, a skull roof decorated with many small pits, and a large pineal opening. The external nares are smaller than those of more derived caseids. The orbits are very large and are directed outwards and slightly forward. In dorsal view, the end of the snout is wider and more rounded than that of the more derived caseidae. The palate is broad and plate-like. A narrow interpterygoid vacuity divides the posterior portions of the palate at the midline. The bones of the palate are almost completely covered with teeth, the largest being on the margins, and the smallest in the center of the palate. The upper jaws had two teeth on each premaxilla and 11 teeth on each maxilla. 12 teeth were present on each hemimandible, some being positioned on the coronoid eminence, a primitive character. The first six teeth of the upper and lower jaws are very strong, conical, almost circular at their base, but more rounded at the apex, and somewhat compressed medio-laterally. Those of the upper jaws are vertical, while the first six teeth of the mandible are directed outward and forward at an angle of forty degrees or more. Few details are visible on the teeth of the holotype FMNH UC 656 and paratype FMNH UC 698 due to very rough preparation of these specimens. However, more careful preparation of the maxillary teeth of the specimen FMNH UC 1011 revealed the presence of tricuspid crowns.

=== Post-cranial skeleton ===
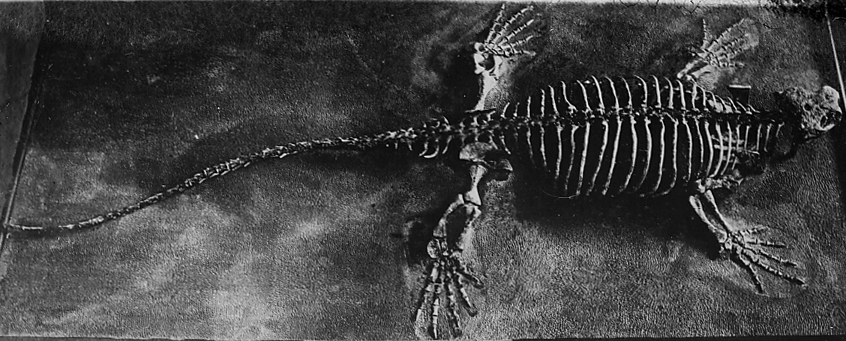
Skeleton from above

Casea is a lightly-built caseid with rather short limbs compared to the length of the animal. The vertebral column has 24 or 25 presacral vertebrae while the sacrum consists of three vertebrae. The tail is not fully known. Three specimens have preserved an articulated caudal series including 18 to 22 vertebrae. On this basis, the total number of caudal vertebrae is estimated to be around fifty. The ribs form a barrel-shaped rib cage, typical of herbivorous caseids. The pelvis presents an ilium with a flared dorsal margin, in the shape of a very wide fan. Its medial surface is flat and smooth with minor streaks along the dorsal margin. The sacral ribs form a single, continuous contact with the ilium which is formed by the overlap of the sacral ribs one and two, as well as between ribs two and three. The tibia is distinguished by its moderately enlarged proximal end, the latter being slightly wider than the distal end, as in Eocasea. In more derived caseids, the proximal end of the tibia is considerably enlarged. An incomplete skeleton of Casea broilii (FMNH UR 2514), from the type locality and only described in 2014, shows an astragalus still articulated with the tibia. Thus, contrary to the descriptions by Romer and Price, and Olson, the astragalus of Casea broilii is an elongate element in which the articulation for the fibula is separated from the articulation with the tibia by a long neck. This difference in interpretation results from a misidentification of a partial and isolated foot (FMNH UC 657) attributed to Casea but which probably belongs to a different animal.

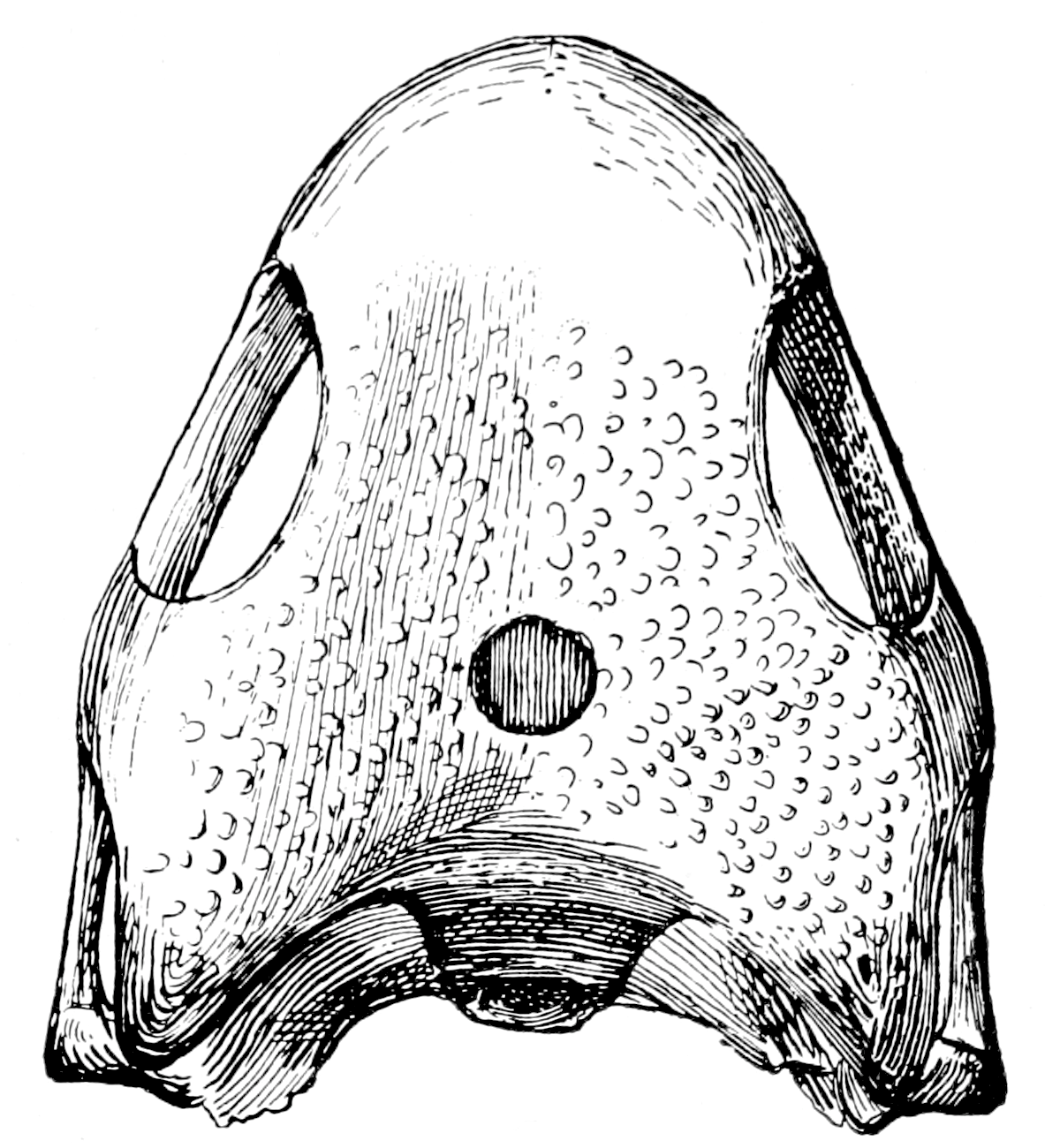
Illustration showing skull form above

== Geographical and stratigraphic range ==
All Casea broilii specimens come from a single fossiliferous pocket known as Cacops bone bed, located in Baylor County, Texas. This locality, discovered and excavated by Paul Miller in 1909 and 1910, is no longer accessible today because it was submerged in the 1920s after the construction of the Lake Kemp dam. The fossil pocket was about 3 m long, 1.8 m wide, and 60 cm thick. It was part of a red clay level interspersed between strata of the upper Arroyo Formation and the coarser sediments of the lower Vale Formation (two formations of the Clear Fork Group). Ammonoids faunas found in marine strata present at the base and top of the Clear Fork Group indicate that the three formations (Arroyo, Vale, and Choza) that compose it represent a relatively short geological duration corresponding to part of the Kungurian. The location and faunal composition of the Cacops bone bed indicate the existence of a distinct fauna that lived in a geographical area far from the floodplains and deltas of coastal regions, where lived the well known fauna from the more classical Lower Permian localities of North America. The Casea specimens were in association with very numerous specimens of the armoured and entirely terrestrial amphibian Cacops (more than 50 individuals are listed including ten skulls, hence the name of the bone bed), a dozen skeletons of the Varanopidae Varanops, and fragments of Seymouria and Captorhinus. Many of the bones were covered with a very thin layer of cemented clay; others were more or less cemented together in nodular masses. Most of the skeletons were lying on their belly, but some were found on their backs. On most of the skeletons the limbs were articulated. In others, the phalanges of the feet were more or less dispersed, and the tail or the entire limbs were disarticulated. It appears from the position of the skeletons and the conditions of deposition that the bodies underwent very little disturbance after the death of the animals. For Williston, these animals would have died in a pool of stagnant and perennial water. The corpses piled on top of each other in successive layers would correspond to an accumulation spread over several generations. However, no taphonomic study of the site has been published, and given the inaccessibility of the locality today it is difficult to say more.

== Taxonomy ==
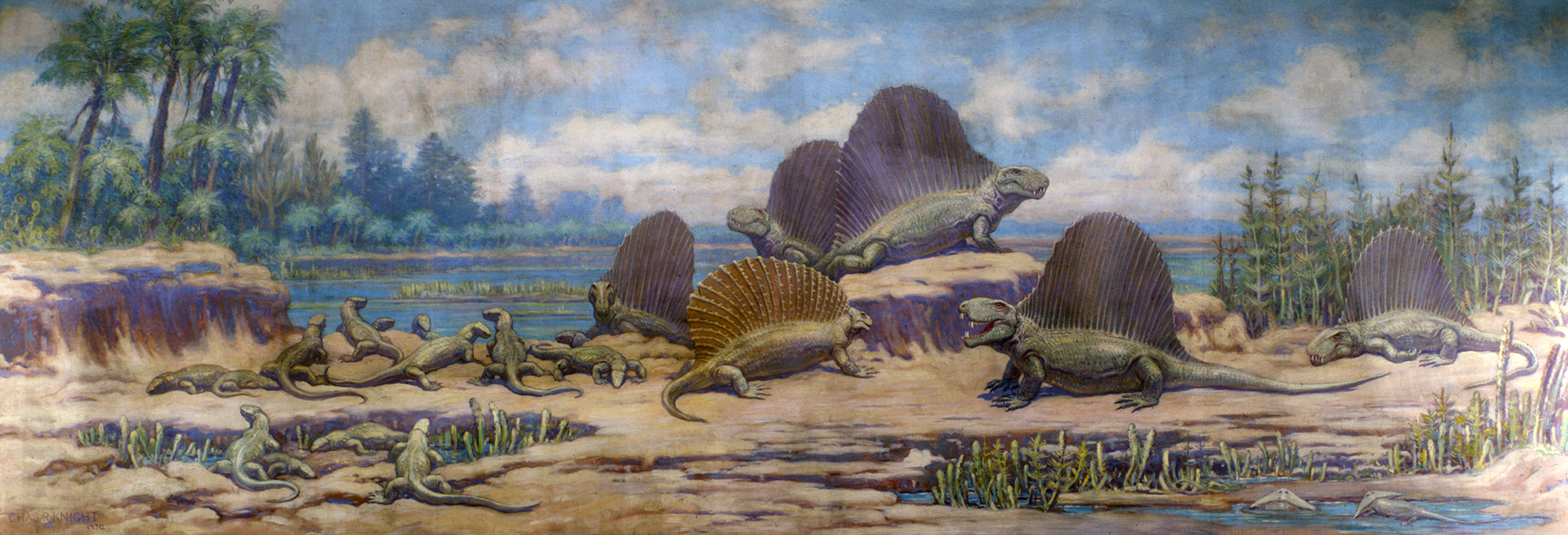
Life restoration of Casea, Dimetrodon and Edaphosaurus by Charles R. Knight from 1931

Currently, the genus Casea contains only the species Casea broilii. In the past, three other species were assigned to the genus, but these represent today separate genera and/or are considered invalid. In 1954, Everett C. Olson reported two new species found in the Clear Fork Group in Texas, Casea nicholsi and C. halselli. In 1974, Denise Sigoneau-Russell and Donald E. Russell established the species Casea rutena for a specimen from southern France. These three species are known from the following material :

- Casea nicholsi is represented by two specimens from the upper part of the Vale Formation in Knox County. The holotype (FMNH UR 86) consists of a partial basicranium and lower jaw (mainly preserved as a natural cast), a large part of the vertebral column (except the tail), part of the pelvis, elements of the forelimbs, and part of the foot. The only referred specimen (FMNH UR 85) was found in direct association with the holotype and, like it, consists of a partial skull, a large part of the vertebral column without the tail, part of the shoulder bones, the pelvis, a femur, and a fibula end.
- Casea halselli comes from more recent strata and was named after a very fragmentary skeleton found in the middle part of the Choza Formation, in Foard County. It consists of a pelvic girdle with damaged ilium, partial left femur and tibia, head of the right femur, four caudal vertebrae, and fragments of lumbar vertebrae.
- Casea rutena comes from the Lower Permian Rodez basin in the Aveyron department in Occitanie region, in the south of France. It is known by a partial skeleton consisting of an almost complete skull, the cervical vertebrae, shoulder bones, the complete left forearm with the complete articulated left manus, and part of the right arm.

In 2008, the first phylogenetic analysis of Caseidae revealed for the first time the paraphyly of the genus Casea, the French species Casea rutena representing a distinct and more derived genus, still not named in this study. Three years later, Casea rutena was removed from the genus Casea and placed in a new genus, Euromycter, with the new combination Euromycter rutenus. In 2015, another study published by Romano and Nicosia again resolved the genus Casea as paraphyletic. Casea nicholsi is identified as a taxon more closely related to the genera Caseoides and Caseopsis than to Casea broilii. Thus, C. nicholsi certainly belongs to a different genus, which is however not sufficiently well known to receive a name. Romano and Nicosia also consider the fragmentary species Casea halselli as a nomen dubium, although important differences with the type species, in the shape and robustness of the femur and tibia, suggest that they belong to a genus other than Casea. According to Werneburg and colleagues, C. halselli is a problematic taxon of uncertain, possibly sphenacomorph affinity.

== Phylogeny ==
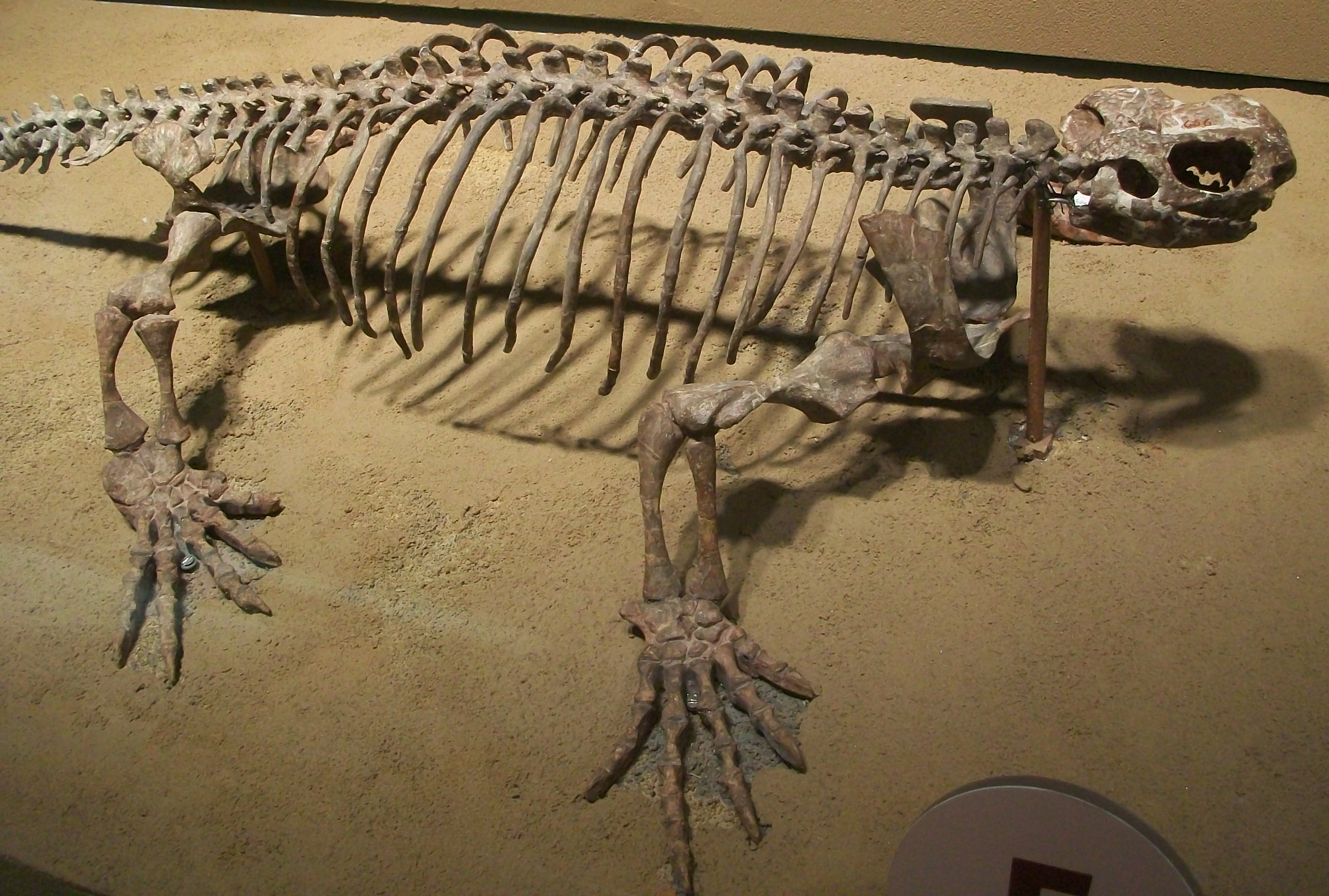
Front part of the holotype skeleton

In the first phylogenetic analysis of Caseidae published in 2008, Casea broilii occupies a basal position within the caseidae, but is however more derived than Oromycter.

Below the first cladogram of Caseidae published by Maddin et al. in 2008.

- Caseasauria
  - Eothyris
  - Caseidae
    - Oromycter dolesorum
    - - Casea broilii
      - - Casea rutena
        - - Ennatosaurus tecton
          - - Cotylorhynchus romeri
            - Angelosaurus dolani

A phylogenetic analysis made by Benson shows a similar position for Casea broilii. This analysis also confirms the paraphyly of the genus Casea.

Below the phylogenetic analysis of Caseasauria published by Benson in 2012.

- Caseasauria
  - Eothyrididae
    - Eothyris parkeyi
    - Oedaleops campi
  - Caseidae
    - Oromycter dolesorum
    - - Casea broilii
      - - Trichasaurus texensis
        - - "Casea" rutena
          - - Ennatosaurus tecton
            - - Angelosaurus romeri
              - - Cotylorhynchus romeri
                - - Cotylorhynchus hancocki
                  - Cotylorhynchus bransoni

A study published in 2015 by Romano & Nicosia, and including almost all the Caseidae (with the exception of Alierasaurus ronchii from Sardinia, considered too fragmentary), shows a similar position for Casea broilii. C. nicholsi is recovered as a more derived taxon, closer to the genera Caseoides and Caseopsis than to Casea broilii.

Below the most pasimonious phylogenetic analysis published by Romano & Nicosia in 2015.

- Caseasauria
  - Eothyris parkeyi
  - Caseidae
    - Oromycter dolesorum
    - - Casea broilii
      - - Euromycter rutenus
        - - - Caseoides sanangeloensis
            - - "Casea" nicholsi
              - Caseopsis agilis
          - - - Cotylorhynchus bransoni
              - - Cotylorhynchus romeri
                - - Cotylorhynchus hancocki
                  - Ruthenosaurus russellorum
            - - Angelosaurus romeri
              - - Angelosaurus dolani
                - Ennatosaurus tecton

In the phylogenetic analysis published in 2022 by Werneburg and colleagues, Casea broilii is positioned between Oromycter and "Casea" nicholsi. The latter occupies a more basal position than in the cladogram of Romano and Nicosia, being recovered as a more basal taxon than the genus Euromycter.

Below is the cladogram published by Werneburg and colleagues in 2022.

- Caseidae
  - Martensius bromackerensis
  - - - Oromycter dolesorum
      - - Casea broilii
        - - "Casea" nicholsi
          - - Euromycter
            - - Ennatosaurus
              - - Angelosaurus dolani
                - "Angelosaurus" romeri
                - - - Ruthenosaurus
                    - Caseopsis
                  - Cotylorhynchus romeri
                  - - Alierasaurus
                    - - "Cotylorhynchus" bransoni
                      - - Lalieudorhynchus
                        - "Cotylorhynchus" hancocki

== Paleobiology ==
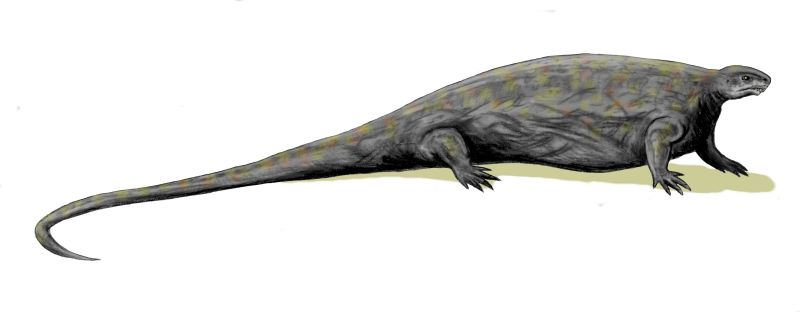
C. broilii restoration

=== Feeding and diet ===
Casea represents one of the first large and highly successful herbivores among terrestrial synapsids. Among vertebrates this feeding strategy can be subdivided into many categories, including folivory, frugivory, and granivory but among early terrestrial vertebrates, it is feeding on leaves, stems, roots and rhizomes. Herbivores use massive crushing dentition on the palate and mandibles. Caseids belong to the most basal clade of synapside, the Caseasauria, which also includes the small carnivorous eothyrdids. In the case of Caseids, herbivory is indicated by the presence of a massive rib cage in the thoracic and dorsal regions, and the expanded trunk extends posteriorly to the pelvic girdle, with large ribs fused to the lumbar vertebrae. This suggests that this feeding strategy originated sometime between the late Pennsylvanian and the Early Permian. Some Caseids show dental specializations, with leaf-like large serrations being present in the marginal dentition.

=== Locomotion ===
The locomotion of Casea involves a three-vertebra sacrum in early synapsids and no apparent link to body size. LeBlanc and Reisz argue that this sacral anatomy was related to more efficient terrestrial locomotion than to increased weight bearing. Selective pressures for weight-bearing or more efficient locomotory styles and increasingly terrestrial lifestyles may have promoted the repeated acquisition of three sacral vertebrae in Synapsida. The development of the third sacral rib attachment to the pelvis in Synapsids may support this hypothesis.
