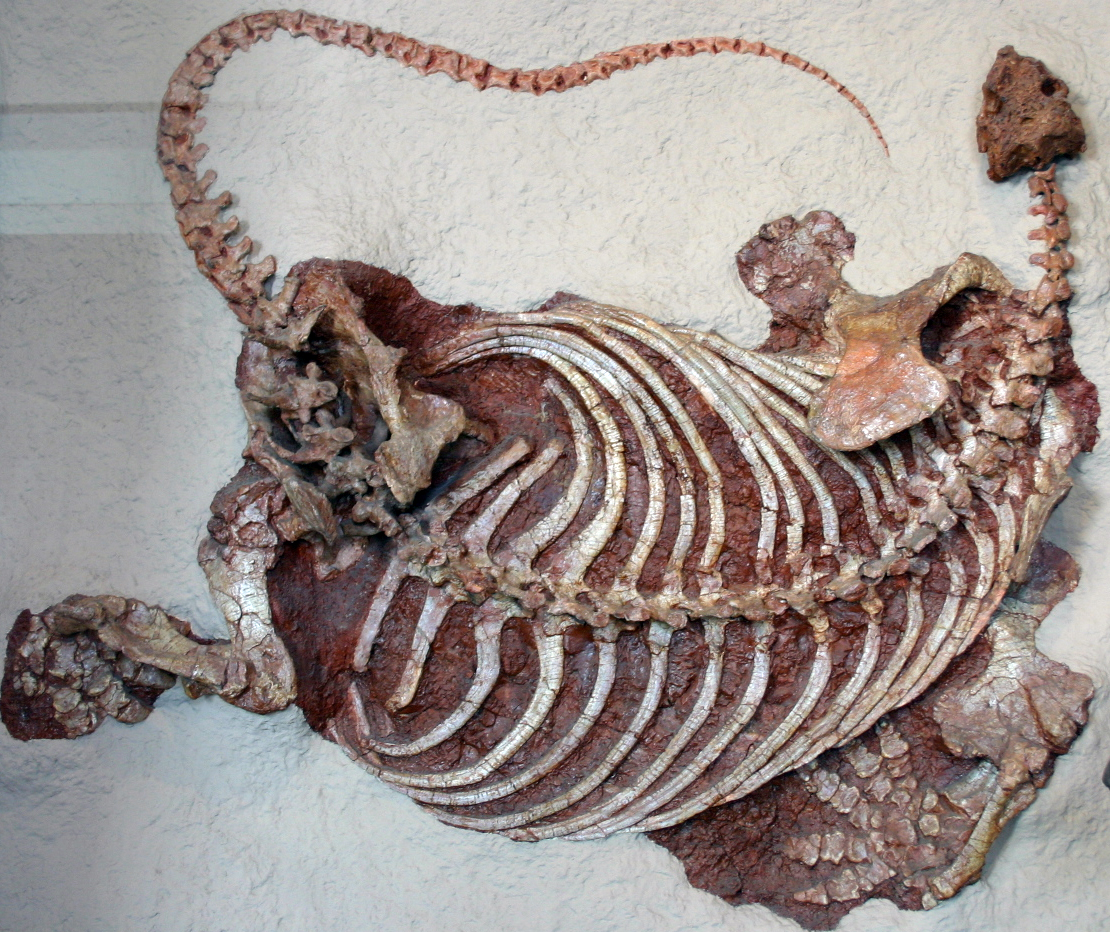
- Fossil skeleton of Cotylorhynchus romeri

Scientific classification
- Kingdom: Animalia
- Phylum: Chordata
- Clade: Synapsida
- Clade: †Caseasauria; Williston, 1912

Families
- †Caseidae †Eothyrididae

= Caseasauria =

Caseasaurs Temporal range: Late Carboniferous-Middle Permian, 306–265 Ma

Extinct clade of synapsids

Caseasauria is one of the two main clades of early synapsids, the other being the Eupelycosauria. Caseasaurs are currently known only from the Late Carboniferous and the Permian, and include two superficially different families, the small insectivorous or carnivorous Eothyrididae, and the large, herbivorous Caseidae. These two groups share a number of specialised features associated with the morphology of the snout and external naris.

The ancestor of caseasaurs can be traced back to an insect eating or an omnivorous reptile-like synapsid from the Pennsylvanian time of the Carboniferous, possibly resembling Archaeothyris, the earliest known synapsid. The caseasaurs were abundant during the later part of the Early Permian, but during the Middle Permian caseasaur diversity declined. The last caseasaurs became extinct between the latest Wordian and earliest Capitanian stage of the Middle Permian.

== Description ==
Among the most conspicuous characteristics uniting caseasaurs are an enlarged nostril and a snout tip that overhangs the tooth row.

Early caseasaurs, including all eothyridids, were relatively small animals. However, most caseids reached larger sizes, and some caseids, such as Cotylorhynchus and Alierasaurus, were among the largest terrestrial animals of the early Permian. These large herbivorous taxa reached a length of 4 to 6 meters (13 to 20 ft) and a mass of 330 to 500 kilograms (730 to 1,100 lb).

== Evolution ==
Caseasaurs first appear in the fossil record in the late Carboniferous, alongside many other early amniote groups. It has been hypothesized earliest possible known synapsid, Asaphestera from the Bashkirian age, may be an eothyridid caseasaur, although recent analysis supported a microsaur classification. The earliest definitive caseasaur was Eocasea.

Caseids thrived during the Kungurian age, and were the most predominant and diverse herbivorous tetrapods near the end of the stage, although they saw a notable decline during Olson’s Extinction. Caseasaurs are one of the two pelycosaur clades known to have survived into the Guadalupian epoch, with the other being varanopids. This was likely due to their preference of upland ecosystems.

At least two or three caseasaur lineages persisted past Olson’s Extinction, two of which were known from the Russia: the small, possibly omnivorous or insectivorous Phreatophasma, and the large, herbivorous Ennatosaurus. The youngest known caseasaur was Lalieudorhynchus, which went extinct during the earliest Capitanian.

== Classification ==
- Seymouriamorpha
- - Diadectomorpha?
  - - Sauropsida
    - Synapsida
      - Diadectomorpha?
      - - Caseasauria
        - - Varanopidae?
          - - Ophiacodontidae
            - - Edaphosauridae
              - - Sphenacodontidae
                - Therapsida

Phylogenetic position of Caseasauria within Reptiliomorpha, showing the possible alternate positions of Diadectomorpha. Varanopidae may belong to Sauropsida.

Caseasauria is generally regarded as the most basal clade of synapsids, with all other synapsids being grouped in the clade Eupelycosauria. However, not all studies have supported this position. In 2012, Roger Benson argued that most of the characters supporting a basal position for caseasaurs pertained to the skull, and presented a phylogenetic analysis incorporating more postcranial data that resolved a clade comprising ophiacodontids and varanopids as the basalmost synapsid clade. However, new postcranial data from eothyridids and basal caseids established that caseasaurs were more basal than ophiacodontids and varanopids after all, with the characters supporting a more derived position for caseasaurs being the result of convergent evolution between caseids and more derived synapsids. The diadectomorphs, conventionally regarded as anamniote tetrapods, may prove to be synapsids even more basal than Caseasauria.

- Eocasea martini
- - Martensius bromackerensis
  - - Casea broili
    - Oromycter dolesorum
    - Trichasaurus texensis
    - Casea nicholsi
    - Euromycter rutenus
    - - Ennatosaurus tecton
      - - Angelosaurus romeri
        - Alierasaurus ronchii
        - Cotylorhynchus romeri
        - Cotylorhynchus bransoni
        - Cotylorhynchus hancocki

Phylogeny of Caseidae, after Berman et al. 2020

Most caseasaurs are divided into two families, Eothyrididae and Caseidae. The affinities of the earliest definitive caseasaur, Eocasea, are uncertain, with some phylogenetic analyses finding it to be a caseid and others finding it to be a basal caseasaur belonging to neither family.

Three genera are typically regarded as belonging to the family Eothyrididae: Eothyris, Oedaleops, and Vaughnictis. However, some phylogenetic analyses have failed to resolve the eothyridids as a clade, instead finding them to be paraphyletic with respect to Caseidae. Asaphestera has been provisionally regarded as an eothyridid as well, without being included in a phylogenetic analysis.

The remaining caseasaurs belong to the family Caseidae.

=== List of species ===
Species of Caseasauria
Genus	Species	Year named	Family	Age	Location	Notes
Eocasea	E. martini	2014	incertae sedis	Gzhelian		May be a caseid
Asaphestera	A. platyris	1934	Eothyrididae	Bashkirian		Synapsida incertae sedis; may be an eothyridid
Eothyris	E. parkeyi	1937	Eothyrididae			
Oedaleops	O. campi	1965	Eothyrididae			
Vaughnictis	V. smithae	1965	Eothyrididae	Asselian–Sakmarian		Originally assigned to the genus Mycterosaurus
Callibrachion	C. gaudryi	1893	Caseidae			
Datheosaurus	D. macrourus	1904	Caseidae			
Oromycter	O. dolesorum	2005	Caseidae			
Phreatophasma	P. aenigmatum	1954	Caseidae	Roadian		
Martensius	M. bromackerensis	2020	Caseidae			
Ruthenosaurus	R. russellorum	2011	Caseidae			
Casea	C. broilii	1910	Caseidae			
Casea	C. halselli	1954	Caseidae			
Casea	C. nicholsi	1954	Caseidae			
Euromycter	E. rutenus	1974	Caseidae			Originally described as Casea rutena
Ennatosaurus	E. tecton	1956	Caseidae			The geologically youngest known caseasaur
Caseopsis	C. agilis	1962	Caseidae			
Caseoides	C. sanangelensis	1953	Caseidae			
Arisierpeton	A. simplex	2019	Caseidae			
Alierasaurus	A. ronchii	2014	Caseidae			
Cotylorhynchus	C. romeri	1937	Caseidae			
Cotylorhynchus	C. hancocki	1953	Caseidae			
Cotylorhynchus	C. bransoni	1962	Caseidae			
Angelosaurus	A. dolani	1953	Caseidae			
Angelosaurus	A. greeni	1962	Caseidae			
Angelosaurus	A. romeri	1962	Caseidae			
Trichasaurus	T. texensis	1910	Caseidae			

== Paleoecology ==
The paleoecology of caseids is debated. They are typically interpreted as terrestrial animals of dry, upland habitats. However, Caseids exhibit a similar bone microstructure to cetaceans and pinnipeds, which has led to the hypothesis that they led an aquatic lifestyle. This hypothesis has been challenged on the grounds that their bone microstructure specifically resembles fully pelagic animals, and is unlike the bone microstructure of semiaquatic animals, but that the body plan of caseids is inconsistent with a pelagic lifestyle. Moreover, caseid fossils are predominantly associated with arid upland deposits.

== See also ==
- Evolution of mammals
- Vertebrate paleontology
- Permian tetrapods

== Bibliography ==
- Angielczyk, Kenneth D.; Kammerer, Christian F. (2018-10-22). "Non-Mammalian synapsids: the deep roots of the mammalian family tree". Mammalian Evolution, Diversity and Systematics. De Gruyter. pp. 117–198. doi:10.1515/9783110341553-005. ISBN 978-3-11-034155-3. S2CID 92370138.
- Benson, R.J. (2012). "Interrelationships of basal synapsids: cranial and postcranial morphological partitions suggest different topologies". Journal of Systematic Palaeontology. 10 (4): 601–624. Bibcode:2012JSPal..10..601B. doi:10.1080/14772019.2011.631042. S2CID 84706899.
- Berman, David S; Maddin, Hillary C.; Henrici, Amy C.; Sumida, Stuart S.; Scott, Diane; Reisz, Robert R. (2020-03-31). "New Primitive Caseid (Synapsida, Caseasauria) from the Early Permian of Germany". Annals of Carnegie Museum. 86 (1): 43. Bibcode:2020AnCM...86...43B. doi:10.2992/007.086.0103. ISSN 0097-4463. S2CID 216027787.
- Brocklehurst, Neil; Fröbisch, Jörg (2017-02-21). "A re-examination of the enigmatic Russian tetrapod Phreatophasma aenigmaticum and its evolutionary implications". Fossil Record. 20 (1): 87–93. Bibcode:2017FossR..20...87B. doi:10.5194/fr-20-87-2017. ISSN 2193-0074.
- Brocklehurst, Neil; Reisz, Robert; Fernandez, Vincent; Fröbisch, Jörg (2016). "A Re-Description of 'Mycterosaurus' smithae, an Early Permian Eothyridid, and Its Impact on the Phylogeny of Pelycosaurian-Grade Synapsids". PLOS ONE. 11 (6) e0156810. Bibcode:2016PLoSO..1156810B. doi:10.1371/journal.pone.0156810. PMC 4917111. PMID 27333277.
- Ford, David P.; Benson, Roger B. J. (2020). "The phylogeny of early amniotes and the affinities of Parareptilia and Varanopidae". Nature Ecology & Evolution. 4 (1): 57–65. doi:10.1038/s41559-019-1047-3. ISSN 2397-334X. PMID 31900445. S2CID 209673326.
- Klembara, Jozef; Ruta, Marcello; Hain, Miroslav; Berman, David S. (2021). "Braincase and Inner Ear Anatomy of the Late Carboniferous Tetrapod Limnoscelis dynatis (Diadectomorpha) Revealed by High-Resolution X-ray Microcomputed Tomography". Frontiers in Ecology and Evolution. 9. doi:10.3389/fevo.2021.709766. ISSN 2296-701X.
- Lambertz, M.; Shelton, C.D.; Spindler, F.; Perry, S.F. (2016). "A caseian point for the evolution of a diaphragm homologue among the earliest synapsids". Annals of the New York Academy of Sciences. 1385 (1): 3–20. Bibcode:2016NYASA1385....3L. doi:10.1111/nyas.13264. PMID 27859325. S2CID 24680688.
- Mann, Arjan; Gee, Bryan M.; Pardo, Jason D.; Marjanović, David; Adams, Gabrielle R.; Calthorpe, Ami S.; Maddin, Hillary C.; Anderson, Jason S. (2020). "Reassessment of historic 'microsaurs' from Joggins, Nova Scotia, reveals hidden diversity in the earliest amniote ecosystem". Papers in Palaeontology. 6 (4): 605–625. Bibcode:2020PPal....6..605M. doi:10.1002/spp2.1316. ISSN 2056-2802. S2CID 218925814.
- Marjanović, David; Laurin, Michel (2019-01-04). "Phylogeny of Paleozoic limbed vertebrates reassessed through revision and expansion of the largest published relevant data matrix". PeerJ. 6 e5565. doi:10.7717/peerj.5565. ISSN 2167-8359. PMC 6322490. PMID 30631641.
- Reisz, Robert R. (1986). Pelycosauria. Handbuch der Paläoherpetologie. Stuttgart; New York: Gustav Fischer Verlag. ISBN 978-3-437-30486-6.
- Reisz, Robert R.; Fröbisch, Jörg (2014). "The Oldest Caseid Synapsid from the Late Pennsylvanian of Kansas, and the Evolution of Herbivory in Terrestrial Vertebrates". PLOS ONE. 9 (4) e94518. Bibcode:2014PLoSO...994518R. doi:10.1371/journal.pone.0094518. PMC 3989228. PMID 24739998.
- Spindler, Frederik; Werneburg, Ralf; Schneider, Joerg W.; Luthardt, Ludwig; Annacker, Volker; Rößler, Ronny (2018). "First arboreal 'pelycosaurs' (Synapsida: Varanopidae) from the early Permian Chemnitz Fossil Lagerstätte, SE Germany, with a review of varanopid phylogeny". PalZ. 92 (2): 315–364. Bibcode:2018PalZ...92..315S. doi:10.1007/s12542-018-0405-9. eISSN 1867-6812. ISSN 0031-0220. S2CID 133846070.
- Sumida, Stuart S; Pelletier, Valerie; Berman, David S. (2014). "New Information on the Basal Pelycosaurian-Grade Synapsid Oedaleops". In Kammerer, Christian F.; Angielczyk, Kenneth D.; Fröbisch, Jörg (eds.). Early Evolutionary History of the Synapsida. Dordrecht: Springer Netherlands. pp. 7–23. doi:10.1007/978-94-007-6841-3_2. ISBN 978-94-007-6840-6.
