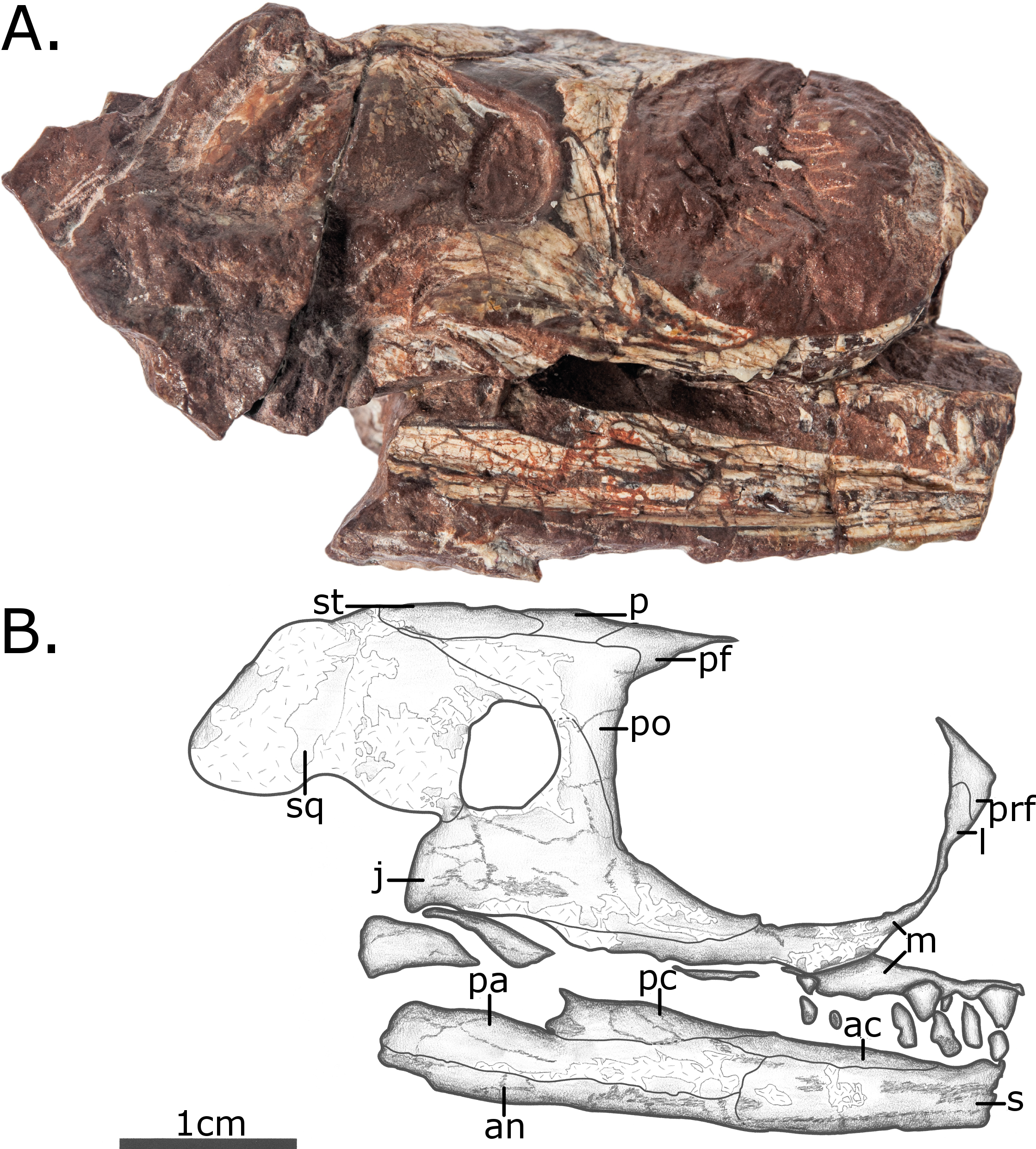
- Skull of holotype
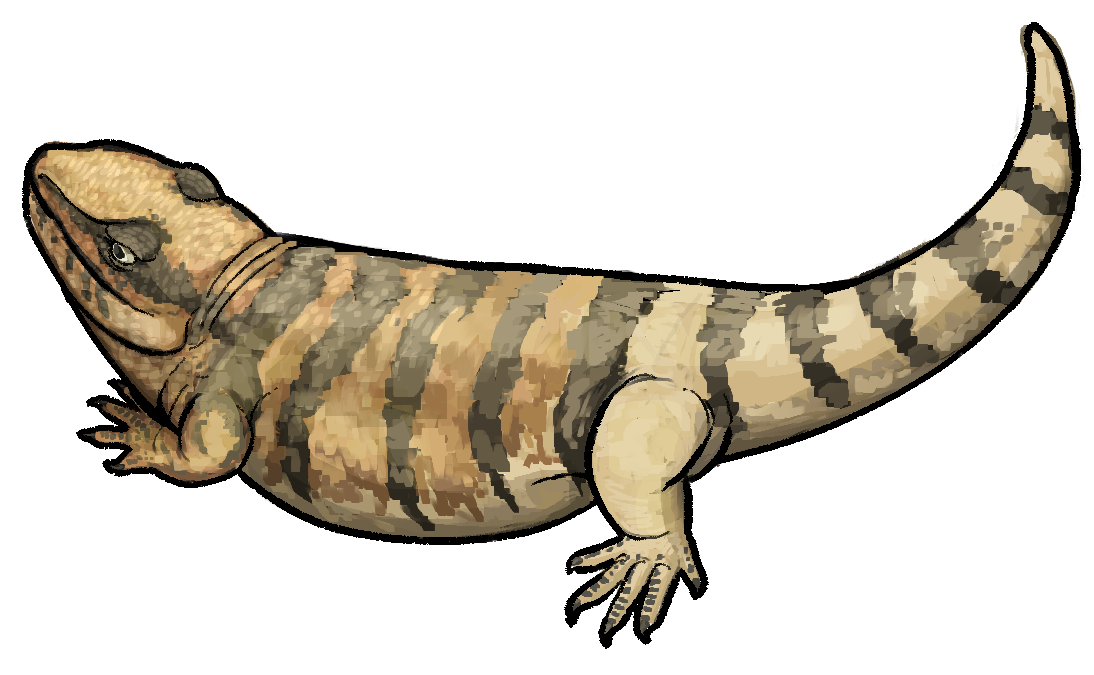
- Life Restoration

Scientific classification
- Kingdom: Animalia
- Phylum: Chordata
- Clade: Synapsida
- Clade: †Caseasauria
- Family: †Eothyrididae
- Genus: †Vaughnictis; Brocklehurst et al., 2016
- Species: †V. smithae

Binomial name
- †Vaughnictis smithae (Lewis & Vaughn, 1965)

= Vaughnictis =

Vaughnictis Temporal range: Early Permian

Extinct genus of synapsids

Vaughnictis is an extinct genus of synapsid from the Early Permian of Colorado in the family Eothyrididae. It was originally assigned to the genus Mycterosaurus before it was assigned to the new genus Vaughnictis. It is known from a partial skull, hindlimb, and a few ribs. It is closely related to Eothyris.
