= Brontopus =

Trace fossil classification
- Domain: Eukaryota
- Kingdom: Animalia
- Phylum: Chordata
- Clade: Synapsida
- Clade: Therapsida
- Ichnogenus: †Brontopus; Heyler & Lessertisseur, 1963

Trace fossil

Brontopus is an ichnogenus of therapsid footprint, possibly produced by dinocephalians or dicynodonts.
