= Caseoides =

Caseoides Temporal range: Kungurian

Scientific classification
- Domain: Eukaryota
- Kingdom: Animalia
- Phylum: Chordata
- Clade: Synapsida
- Clade: †Caseasauria
- Family: †Caseidae
- Genus: †Caseoides; Olson and Beerbower, 1953
- Species: †C. sanangeloensis

Binomial name
- †Caseoides sanangeloensis Olson and Beerbower, 1953

Extinct genus of synapsids

Caseoides is an extinct genus of large caseid synapsids that lived in the Kungurian Age (late Early Permian epoch). It was about 3 metres (9.8 ft) long, and like many other caseids, it was herbivorous and aquatic. It weighed between 150 and 200 kilograms (330 and 440 lb). Its fossils were found in San Angelo Formation, Texas. Caseoides was very similar to Casea, but was slightly larger in size. Caseoides was a heavily built creature, as are most of the Caseids (except Caseopsis). In the development of its proportionally thick, stout limbs it represents the culmination of the Casea lineage. Its relatives became smaller during the Roadian Age. Only poorly preserved postcranial material is known including limbs.

== See also ==
- List of pelycosaurs
- Caseopsis - a relative of Caseoides, they lived side by side in Texas, but Caseopsis was lightly built, unlike Caseoides
- Casea - another relative, only smaller, but Casoides and Casea were very similar in body shape
