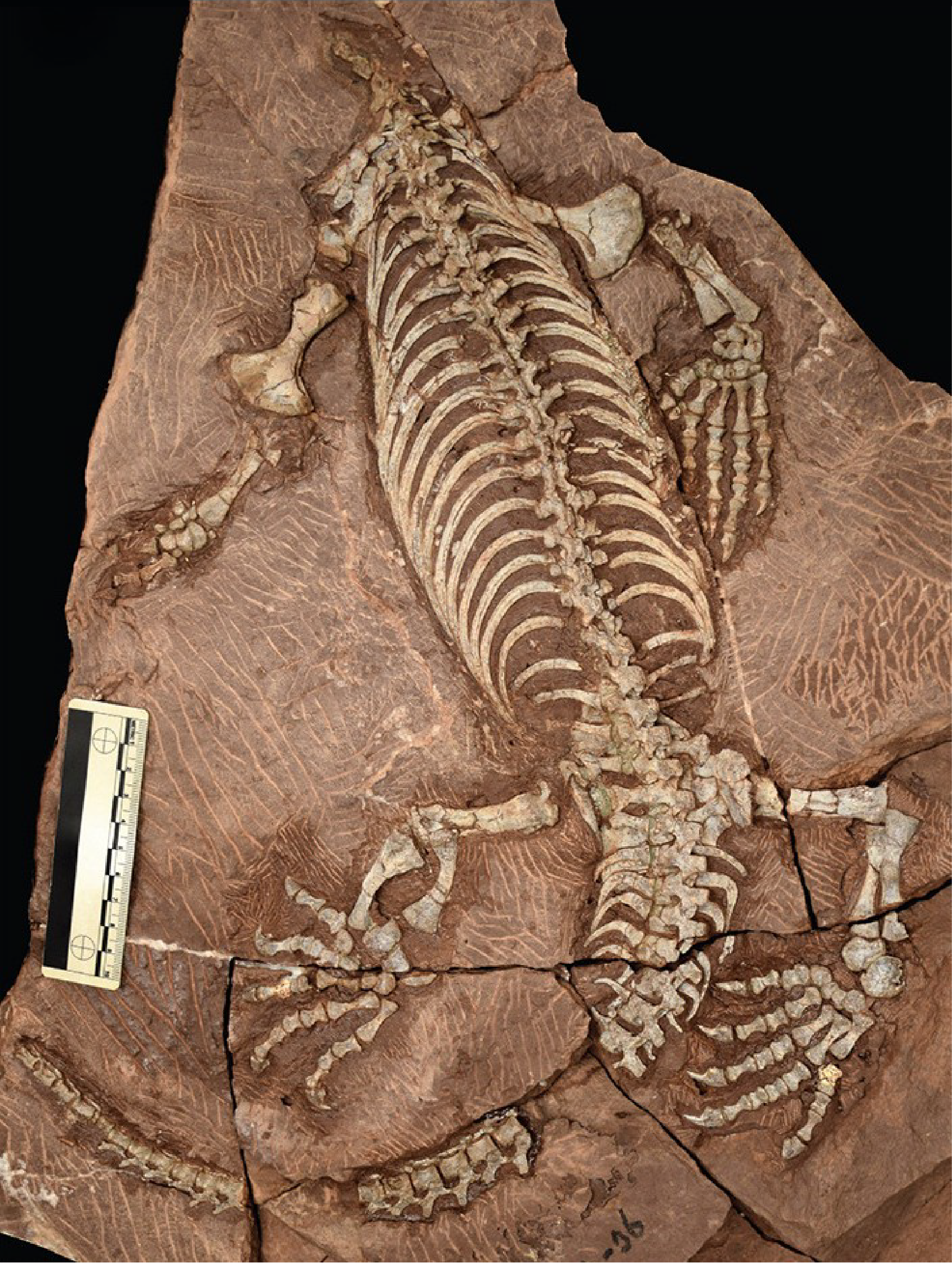
- MNG 14230, a juvenile paratype of M. bromackerensis

Scientific classification
- Kingdom: Animalia
- Phylum: Chordata
- Clade: Synapsida
- Clade: †Caseasauria
- Family: †Caseidae
- Genus: †Martensius; Berman et al., 2020
- Species: †M. bromackerensis

Binomial name
- †Martensius bromackerensis Berman et al., 2020

= Martensius =

Martensius Temporal range: Early Permian

Extinct genus of synapsid

Martensius is an extinct genus of caseid synapsid from the Early Permian of Germany. The type species is Martensius bromackerensis.
