= Caseopsis =

Caseopsis Temporal range: Kungurian

Scientific classification
- Domain: Eukaryota
- Kingdom: Animalia
- Phylum: Chordata
- Clade: Synapsida
- Clade: †Caseasauria
- Family: †Caseidae
- Genus: †Caseopsis; Olson, 1962
- Species: †C. agilis

Binomial name
- †Caseopsis agilis Olson, 1962

Extinct genus of synapsids

Caseopsis is an extinct genus of large pelycosaurs that was about 3 metres (10 ft) long. Caseopsis lived in the late Early Permian epoch (Kungurian Age), before the pelycosaurs were replaced by the more advanced therapsids (in the next age). It was a lightly built, agile creature. It may have been possible for this species to outpace and escape large predators such as Dimetrodon.

== See also ==
- List of pelycosaurs
