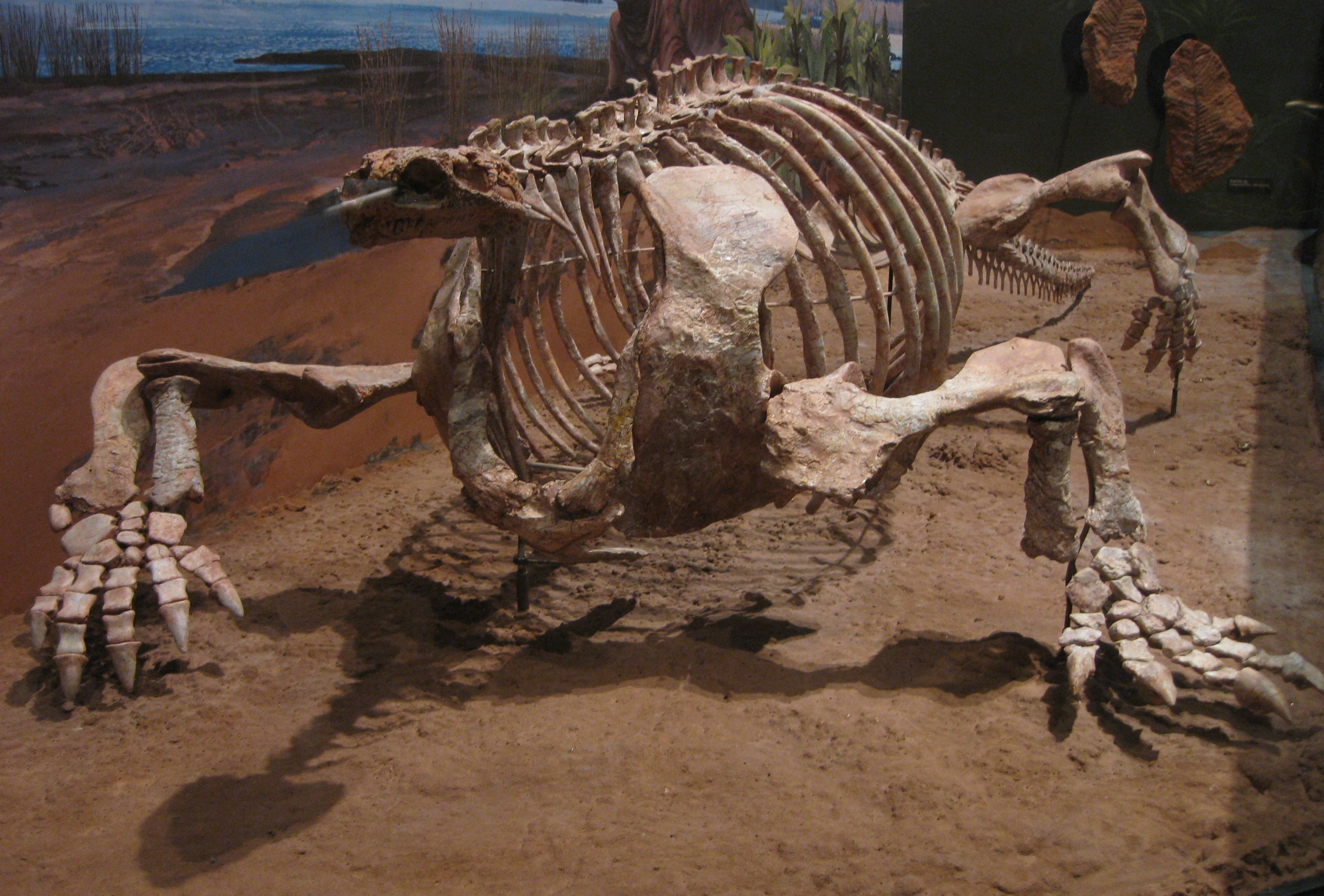
- Skeleton of C. romeri on display at the Sam Noble Oklahoma Museum of Natural History.

Scientific classification
- Kingdom: Animalia
- Phylum: Chordata
- Clade: Synapsida
- Clade: †Caseasauria
- Family: †Caseidae
- Genus: †Cotylorhynchus; Stovall, 1937

Type species
- †Cotylorhynchus romeri Stovall, 1937

Species
- †C. romeri Stovall, 1937; †C. hancocki Olson & Beerbower, 1953; †C. bransoni Olson & Barghusen, 1962

= Cotylorhynchus =

Cotylorhynchus Temporal range: Kungurian - Roadian, 279.5–270 Ma

Extinct genus of synapsids

Cotylorhynchus is an extinct genus of herbivorous caseid synapsids that lived during the late Lower Permian (Kungurian) and possibly the early Middle Permian (Roadian) in what is now the states of Texas and Oklahoma in the United States. The large number of specimens found make it the best-known caseid.

Like all large herbivorous caseids, Cotylorhynchus had a short snout sloping forward and very large external nares. The head was very small compared to the size of the body, which was massive, barrel-shaped, and ended with a long tail. The barrel-shaped body must have housed large intestines, suggesting that the animal had to feed on a large quantity of plants of low nutritional value. The limbs were short and robust. The hands and feet had short, broad fingers with powerful claws.

Caseids are generally considered to be terrestrial, though a semi-aquatic lifestyle has been proposed by some authors. The genus Cotylorhynchus is represented by three species, the largest of which could reach more than 6 metres (20 feet) in length. However, a study published in 2022 suggests that the genus may be paraphyletic, with two of the three species possibly belonging to separate genera.

== Discovery ==
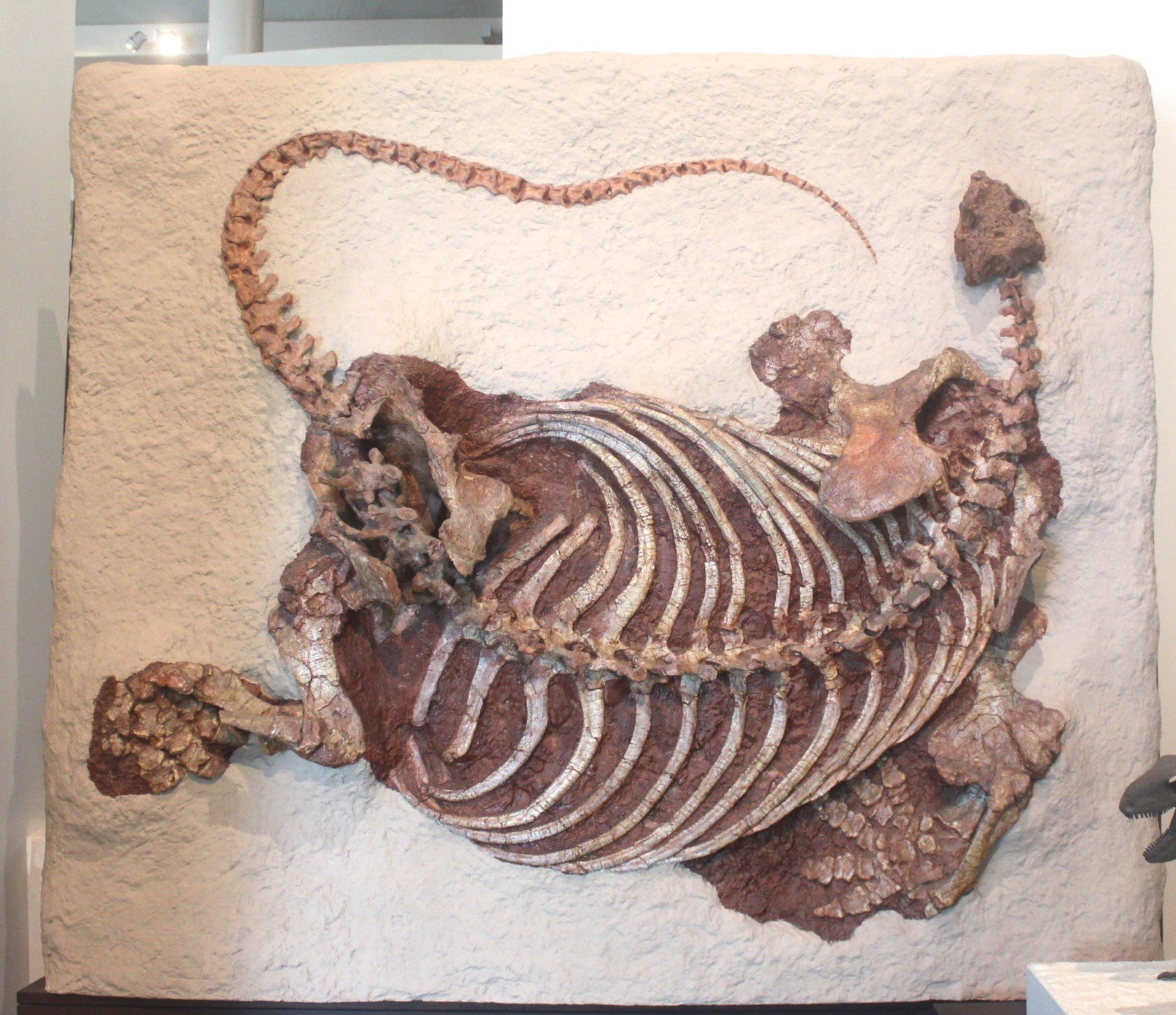
Composite skeleton of Cotylorhynchus romeri (AMNH FARB 7517). The skull is a cast of specimen OMNH 04329 and the tail appears to be reassembled.

The genus name Cotylorhynchus comes from the Greek kotyle ("cup" or "hollow"), and rhynchos ("beak" or "snout"). The genus was named after the nasal opening, which is surrounded by a depressed, cup-shaped bony surface.

The genus Cotylorhynchus contains three species which differ in size and proportion: C. romeri (the type species), C. hancocki, and C. bransoni. There are two size groups in C. romeri, which presumably represents sexual dimorphism. There is no size overlap between adults of C. romeri and C. hancocki, but larger specimens of C. bransoni have roughly the same dimensions as smaller specimens of C. romeri. In 2022, Werneburg and colleagues suggested that the species C. hancocki and C. bransoni might not belong to the genus Cotylorhynchus. These authors consider that a detailed revision of these two taxa is necessary to clarify their status.

== Description ==
Size of C. romeri compared to a human

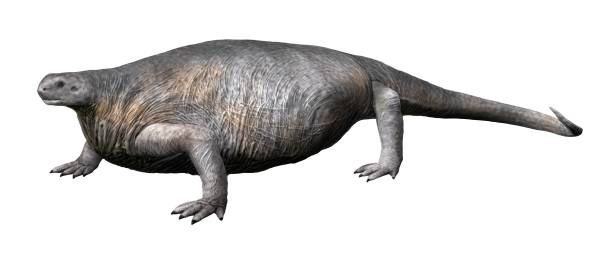
Life restoration of C. romeri

The skull of Cotylorhynchus exhibits the typical caseid morphology, with a forward sloping snout, very large nasal opening, a skull roof with numerous small depressions, and a very large pineal foramen. The latter is more wide than long, as in Ennatosaurus, and thus differs from that of Euromycter, which is subcircular. The number of teeth in the upper and lower jaws ranges from 16 to 20. In the upper jaw, the anterior teeth are long and slender, while those behind decrease in size posteriorly and are slightly spatulate. All of the marginal teeth have their distal end slightly inclined towards the interior of the mouth, and the top of their crowns each have three small cuspules arranged longitudinally. These teeth also show an enlargement of the central part of the crown. In the lower jaw, the anterior teeth, not denticulate according to Olson, are shorter and tilt slightly forward. Other lower teeth are similar to those in the upper jaw.

The postcranial skeleton is massive. The ribs are very long, heavy and curved to form a bulbous body. Ribs are present on all the presacral vertebrae and the first caudal vertebrae. The five posterior presacral ribs are fused with the transverse processes of the vertebrae. The sacrum contains three vertebrae. The neural spines of larger specimens become proportionately taller, especially in the pelvic region. The limbs are short and strong. The femur is characterized by its proximal end having a broad shelf marked by a margin slightly overhanging the dorsal surface of the femur. The pes and manus are broad and short, and terminate in strong, sharp, and curved ungual phalanges which must have supported powerful claws. Muscle and tendon scars are very developed.

=== Cotylorhynchus romeri ===
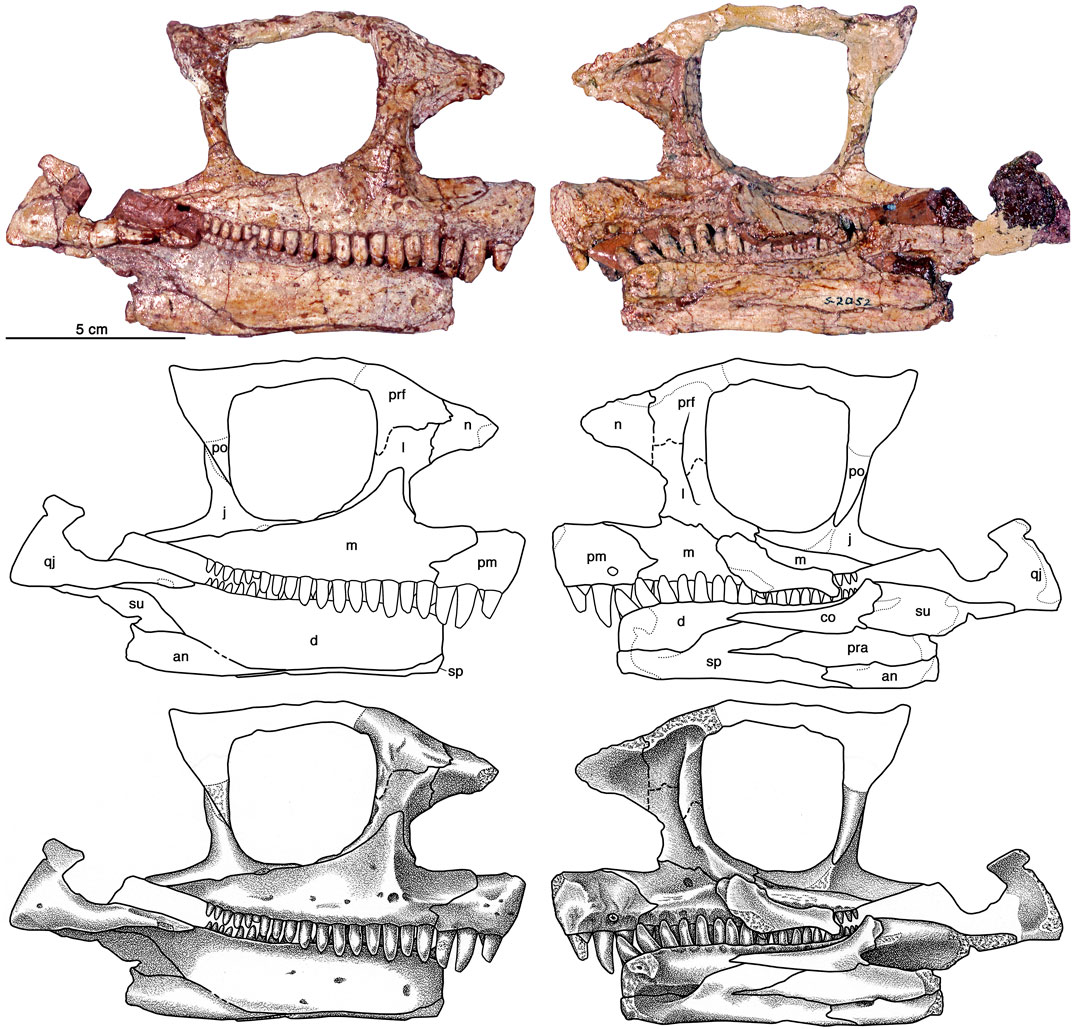
Cotylorhynchus romeri (Holotype OMNH 00637) from Navina, Logan County : right lateral and medial views of skull. Abbreviations : an, angular; co, coronoid; d, dentary; j, jugal; l, lacrimal; m, maxilla; n, nasal; pm, premaxilla; po, postorbital; pra, prearticular; prf, prefrontal; qj, quadratojugal; sp, splenial; su, surangular.

The type species Cotylorhynchus romeri is the best known species of the genus. It was erected in 1937 by J. Willis Stovall from the holotype OMNH 00637, consisting of the right side of a skull, an incomplete interclavicle, and the right and left manus, found in the red mudstones of the lower part of the Hennessey Formation, near the locality of Navina in Logan County, Oklahoma. The name of the species honors the American paleontologist Alfred Sherwood Romer.

Shortly after the holotype's discovery, numerous specimens were found in some 20 sites surrounding the town of Norman in Cleveland County, Oklahoma, also from the Hennessey Formation. These finds include several fairly complete skeletons and many more fragmentary ones, totaling about 40 individuals. Specimens from the two regions are more or less contemporaneous and are only known within a 100-foot (30-metre) thick stratigraphic interval. In Navina, the holotype comes from a level about 200 feet (61 metres) above the base of the Hennessey Formation. The numerous specimens from the Norman area have been found in several layers located between 150 and 250 feet (46 and 76 metres) above the base of the formation.

The holotype of C. romeri has 20 teeth in upper jaws (three on the premaxilla and 17 on the maxilla) and 19 teeth in lower jaws. C. romeri from the Norman region show a lower number of teeth. Four skulls where tooth counting was possible have 15 or 16 teeth in upper jaws. Some authors have thus considered that the holotype of C. romeri and the referred specimens from Norman represent two different species. However, the lack of specimens in the type locality (the holotype of C. romeri being the only known fossil there) and the number of teeth being the only difference with the Cotylorhynchus from Norman, it was decided to keep all these specimens in the same species.

C. romeri is a large species that can exceed 3.60 metres (11.8 ft) in length and 330 kg (730 lb) in weight according to Romer and Price, or 4.50 metres (14.8 ft) in length according to Stovall. Robert Reisz and colleagues have identified several cranial autapomorphies in this species. Cotylorhynchus romeri is distinguished by transversely broad postparietals that contact the supratemporals laterally, a large supratemporal that restricts contact between the parietal and postorbital, a stapes that has a short massive distal shaft and a ventral process that is braced against the quadrate ramus of the pterygoid, both vomers bearing three large teeth along the medial edge of the bone, the presence of teeth on the parasphenoid, and a surangular overlapping the posterodorsal tip of the dentary and excluding it from the coronoid eminence. However, Reisz and colleagues emphasize the fact that these autapomorphies are ambiguous because they are identified, with a few exceptions (a few bones of the palate), on parts of the skull still unknown in other species of the genus, thus limiting comparisons.

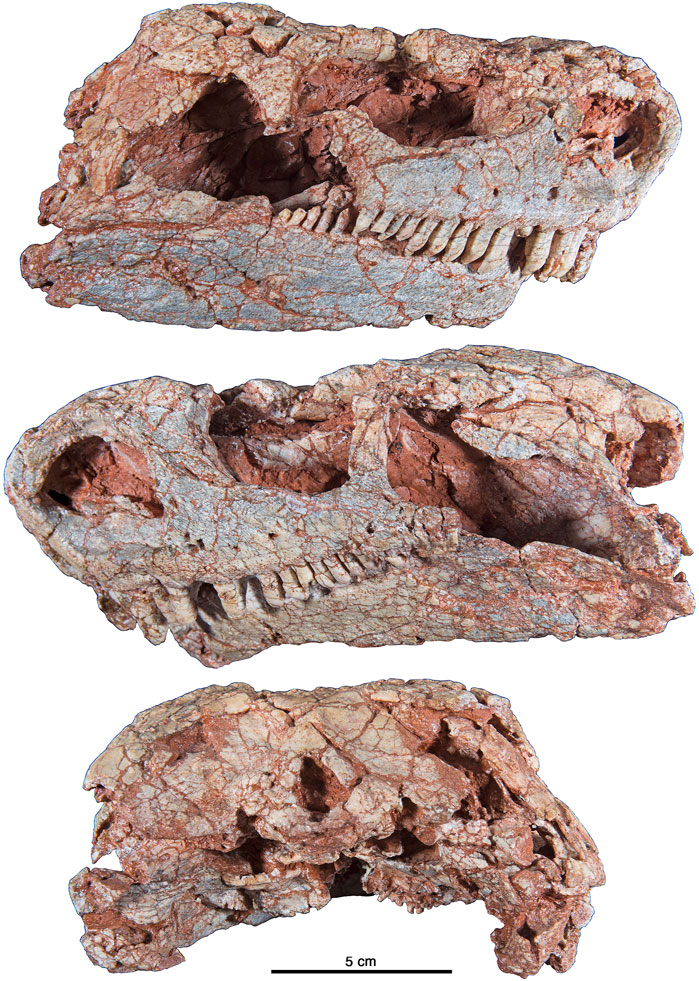
Cotylorhynchus romeri, OMNH 04329, referred specimen. Skull in lateral and occipital views. This is the most complete skull of C. romeri from the Norman area, Cleveland County.

As the other two species of Cotylorhynchus, the dentition consists of tricuspid teeth (except for the most anterior teeth). However, C. romeri is the species where the cuspules are least developed. According to Olson, the premaxillary teeth had no cuspules. The latter, however, have been reported on the premaxillary teeth by Reisz and colleagues. All marginal teeth have their distal ends curved lingually. Numerous teeth are also present on several bones of the palate (palatal dentition). A short row of three large, slightly recurved teeth are present on each vomer. They are taller than all other teeth on the palate. The palatines bear 10 subconical teeth located on a slightly thickened region of bone adjacent to the middle part of the suture shared with the pterygoid. The latter, triangular in shape, has many teeth divided into four distinct groups: a medial row bordering the interpterygoid vacuity, a group of smaller teeth which contributes to the pterygo-palatine tooth cluster, a posterolateral cluster of very small teeth on the transverse flange of the pterygoid, and behind this cluster a row of large teeth that borders the posterior margin of the transverse flange and extends medially to the basicranial region. In summary, the pterygoid bears more, smaller and slender teeth than those present on the pterygoid of C. bransoni. A few teeth are also present on the parasphenoid. Several palatal teeth have well-preserved tips showing the same distal morphology as marginal teeth with three small cuspules. In lower jaws, the dentary has between 16 and 19 teeth, which have the same morphology as the teeth of the upper jaws. In C. romeri, the dental row does not show spaces for replacement teeth which could be related to reduced rates of tooth replacement and increased longevity of functional teeth.

The vertebral column consists of 25 or 26 presacral vertebrae, three sacral vertebrae, and approximately 55 caudal vertebrae. C. romeri is distinguished by its widely spaced postzygapophyses on the dorsal vertebrae, while in C. hancocki and C. bransoni they usually contact along the midline. The relatively short limbs were more robust than those of C. bransoni but less massive than those of C. hancoki. The manus and the pes show a phalangeal formula (Note: The phalangeal formula corresponds to the number of phalanges constituting each digits of the manus and pes of tetrapods. It is listed starting from digit I (corresponding in human to the thumb and big toe) to digit V (the equivalent of the little finger and little toe).) of 2-2-3-3-2. The skeletons from the Norman region show two different size groups within adult specimens. One of these groups is composed of individuals about 20% smaller than those in the other group. This size difference was interpreted as possible specific differentiation or more likely as the expression of sexual dimorphism.

=== Cotylorhynchus hancocki ===
Cotylorhynchus hancocki was named in 1953 by Everett Claire Olson and James R. Beerbower, from a right humerus and a proximal end of a tibia (constituting the holotype FMNH UR 154) found in the upper part of the San Angelo Formation, near the Pease River, in Hardeman County, Texas. The species is named after J. Hancock, who made it possible to explore much of the locality of Pease River. Subsequently, more than sixty specimens, ranging from isolated bone to nearly complete skeleton, were discovered in several localities in Knox County, the majority however coming from the Kahn quarry. This site has yielded the most complete specimens of the species such as FMNH UR 581, an almost complete skeleton missing only the skull, some cervical vertebrae, a scapulocoracoid and some limb bones; FMNH UR 622, a partial skeleton including part of the skull and palate, various vertebrae, ribs, limb bones, clavicle, and bones of the foot; and FMNH UR 703, part of the skeleton of a very large individual including dorsal, lumbar, sacral, and caudal vertebrae, pelvis, femur, radius, ulna, and ribs. Other notable specimens include several isolated cranial bones. All of the skull bones known in this species come from the Kahn quarry.

With a size of up to 6 metres (20 ft) in length and a weight of over 500 kg (1,100 lb), C. hancocki is by far the largest species of the genus, and is one of the largest known caseids along with the genus Alierasaurus. Its dimensions also make it one of the largest non-mammalian synapsids. No complete skull of C. hancocki is known. The various known elements (maxilla, dentaries, braincase, palate bones), indicate a skull similar to that of C. romeri but slightly larger. The upper teeth are not fully known. Several isolated mandibles show that the lower dentition had up to 18 slightly spatulate and tricuspid teeth. The cuspules of the upper teeth are weaker than those of the lower teeth. In addition, cuspules of C. hancocki are more pronounced than those of C. romeri, but less developed than those of C. bransoni.

The postcranial skeleton is distinguished by the morphology and proportions of limbs, vertebrae, and pelvis. The scapulocoracoid is characterized by the presence of a supraglenoid foramen on the scapular blade. Such a foramen is absent in the other two species of Cotylorhynchus and in caseids in general but is present in the genus Lalieudorhynchus. The scapula has a process-like bulged anteromedial margin as in Lalieudorhynchus. The humerus has a flat, very broad and thin epicondyle, and a completely closed entepicondylar foramen. The most complete vertebral column is that of specimen FMNH UR 581 in which there are seventeen presacral vertebrae and thirty-nine caudal vertebrae in articulation. A characteristic related to the very large size of this species is the presence of a prominent hyposphene on the postzygapophyses of the dorsal vertebrae, a character shared with Lalieudorhynchus. This supplementary intervertebral joint strengthened and stabilized the vertebral column to support the weight of the animal. The neural spine of the first caudal and sacral vertebra is very elongated dorsally as in Lalieudorhynchus. The limb bones are very strong. The femur in particular is very massive with a relatively short shaft and a very developed internal trochanter, another character shared with Lalieudorhynchus. The bone as a whole is proportionately shorter and wider than that of the other two species of Cotylorhynchus. The pelvis is characterized by a distinctly larger anterolateral projection of the pubis than in C. romeri, and a sacrum with a very large anterior sacral rib, while the second and third sacral ribs are small and less specialized. An incomplete foot is preserved in FMNH UR 581. The astragalus of C. hancocki differs from that of the other two species of Cotylorhynchus and resembles that of Lalieudorhynchus in being nearly as broad as long. The digit IV is complete and has three elements. The positions of the preserved elements of the digits II and III suggest a phalangeal formula of ? -2-2-3-?.

=== Cotylorhynchus bransoni ===
Cotylorhynchus bransoni was named in 1962 by Everett C. Olson and Herbert Barghusen from numerous bones found in the Omega Quarry in Kingfisher County, Oklahoma. Its remains were originally described as coming from the central part of the Flowerpot Formation. Olson later corrected this attribution by specifying that these remains belong to a tongue of the Chickasha Formation (El Reno Group) whose deposits interfinger in places with those of the Flowerpot, Blaine, and Dog Creek formations. The species name honors Dr. Carl C. Branson who, at the time of the species description, was the director of the Oklahoma Geological Survey, and who supported the paleontological research of the Chickasha Formation. The holotype FMNH UR 835, consists of the left side of the pelvis, a left femur, and several partial sacral ribs. Other specimens are represented by FMNH UR 836, a right tibia and fibula, tarsus bones, metatarsals, and phalanges except unguals; FMNH UR 837, a left radius and ulna, and part of the carpal bones; FMNH UR 838, a flattened left astragalus; FMNH UR 839, an immature left tibia; FMNH UR 840, a poorly preserved left fibula from an immature individual; FMNH UR 841, a fragment of the left maxilla with two teeth; FMNH UR 842, two fragments of ungual phalanges; and FMNH UR 843, an ungual phalanx. Further excavations in the Omega quarry have uncovered many additional bones, including several previously unknown skeletal elements. This additional material includes FMNH UR 905, a partial foot; FMNH UR 910, cervical ribs; FMNH UR 912, a clavicle; FMNH UR 913, a chevron; FMNH UR 915, a series of vertebrae; FMNH UR 918 and 919, two scapulo-coracoids; FMNH UR 923, sacral vertebrae; FMNH UR 929, a pterygoid; and FMNH UR 937, caudal vertebrae. Finally, three sites in the Hitchcock area of Blaine County provided specimens UR 972, caudal vertebrae; UR 982, 4 dorsal vertebrae; UR 983, dorsal vertebrae; UR 984, an incomplete humerus; and UR 988, part of the pelvis and a complete articulated foot still associated with part of the tibia and fibula.

C. bransoni is the smallest known species of the genus Cotylorhynchus, with its largest representatives comparable in size to the smallest individuals of C. romeri. The skull is poorly known and is only represented by two dentigerous bones: a fragment of a maxilla and a pterygoid. The teeth present on these elements distinguish C. bransoni from the other two species of the genus. The two tricuspid teeth preserved on the maxilla show more developed cuspules than those observed in C. romeri and C. hancocki. The pterygoid has fewer, larger and more robust teeth than those present in the pterygoid of C. romeri.

The scapulocoracoid has a proportionally narrower scapular blade than in the other two species. The glenoid cavity is somewhat longer in proportion to its width than in the other two species, and the anterior part of the coracoid plate is less extended anteriorly. The radius and ulna are relatively thin and short. The pelvis is characterized by the strong development of the ilium, which rises like a lamina above the acetabulum. The femur is gracile with a slender shaft and a fourth trochanter lying far down the shaft. The distal condyles are widely spaced. The astragalus is characterized by the presence of a very large foramen, a feature not present in the other two species. Olson and Barghusen thought that the phalangeal formula of the foot in C. bransoni was 2-2-2-3-2, a smaller formula than that of the two other species of Cotylorhynchus. However, Romano and Nicosia showed in 2015 that digit III had three phalanges and not two. Thus, the phalangeal formula of the foot of C. bransoni was 2-2-3-3-2 as in C. romeri and probably also in C. hancocki.

== Phylogeny ==
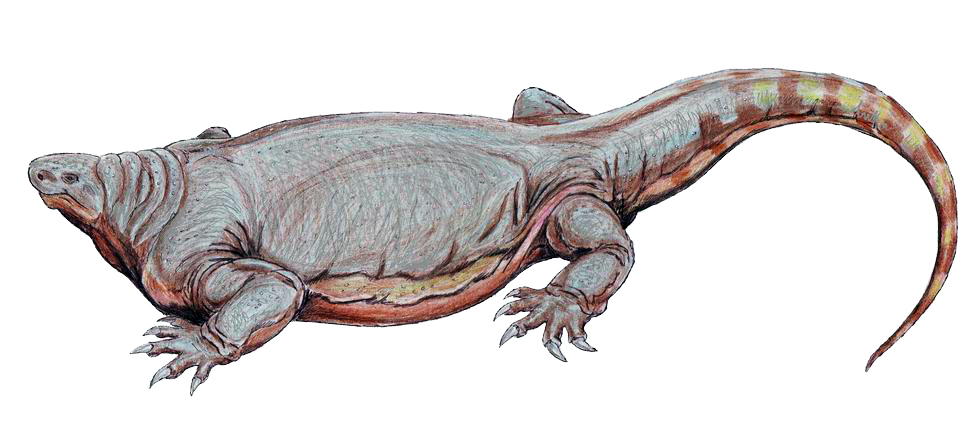
Restoration of C. hancocki, which may belong in another genus

All phylogenetics studies of caseids consider Cotylorhynchus to be a taxon close to the genera Ennatosaurus and Angelosaurus. In the first phylogenetic analysis of caseids published in 2008, the species Cotylorhynchus romeri is recovered as the sister group of Angelosaurus dolani.

Below is the first caseid cladogram published by Maddin et al. in 2008.

- Caseasauria
  - Eothyris
  - Caseidae
    - Oromycter dolesorum
    - - Casea broilii
      - - Casea rutena
        - - Ennatosaurus tecton
          - - Cotylorhynchus romeri
            - Angelosaurus dolani

Another phylogenetic analysis performed in 2012 by Benson identifies Cotylorhynchus romeri as the sister group of the two species C. Hancocki and C. bransoni.

Below is the caseasaurs cladogram released by Benson in 2012.

- Caseasauria
  - Eothyrididae
    - Eothyris parkeyi
    - Oedaleops campi
  - Caseidae
    - Oromycter dolesorum
    - - Casea broilii
      - - Trichasaurus texensis
        - - "Casea" rutena
          - - Ennatosaurus tecton
            - - Angelosaurus romeri
              - - Cotylorhynchus romeri
                - - Cotylorhynchus hancocki
                  - Cotylorhynchus bransoni

In 2015, Romano and Nicosia published the first cladistic study including almost all caseids, except the very fragmentary taxa such as Alierasaurus ronchii and Angelosaurus greeni. In this analysis, the three species of Cotylorhynchus form a clade with the genus Ruthenosaurus, and this clade is the sister group of a clade containing the genera Angelosaurus and Ennatosaurus.

Below is the caseid cladogram published by Romano and Nicosia in 2015.

- Caseasauria
  - Eothyris parkeyi
  - Caseidae
    - Oromycter dolesorum
    - - Casea broilii
      - - Euromycter rutenus
        - - - Caseoides sanangeloensis
            - - "Casea" nicholsi
              - Caseopsis agilis
          - - - Cotylorhynchus bransoni
              - - Cotylorhynchus romeri
                - - Cotylorhynchus hancocki
                  - Ruthenosaurus russellorum
            - - Angelosaurus romeri
              - - Angelosaurus dolani
                - Ennatosaurus tecton

In 2020, two cladograms published by Berman and colleagues also recover Cotylorhynchus as one of the most derived caseids. In the first cladogram, the three species of Cotylorhynchus together with Angelosaurus and Alierasaurus form an unresolved polytomy. In the second cladogram, Cotylorhynchus hancocki and C. bransoni are sister taxa and form a polytomy with Cotylorhynchus romeri and Alierasaurus.

Below are the two caseids cladograms published by Berman and colleagues in 2020.

- Caseidae
  - Eocasea martini
  - - - Martensius bromackerensis
      - - Casea broilii
        - Oromycter dolesorum
        - Trichasaurus texensis
        - Casea nicholsi
        - Euromycter rutenus
        - - Ennatosaurus tecton
          - - Angelosaurus romeri
            - Alierasaurus ronchii
            - Cotylorhynchus romeri
            - Cotylorhynchus bransoni
            - Cotylorhynchus hancocki

- Caseidae
  - Eocasea martini
  - - - Martensius bromackerensis
      - - Casea broilii
        - - Oromycter dolesorum
          - Trichasaurus texensis
          - - Casea nicholsi
            - - Euromycter rutenus
              - - Ennatosaurus tecton
                - - Angelosaurus romeri
                  - - Alierasaurus ronchii
                    - Cotylorhynchus romeri
                    - - Cotylorhynchus bransoni
                      - Cotylorhynchus hancocki

A phylogenetic analysis published in 2022 by Werneburg and colleagues suggests that the genus Cotylorhynchus would be paraphyletic. According to these authors, the species Cotylorhynchus hancocki and C. bransoni would not belong to this genus and would require a detailed revision to clarify their status, these taxa not having been studied since the 1960s. In this analysis, the type species C. romeri is positioned just above the genus Angelosaurus, and forms a polytomy with a clade containing Ruthenosaurus and Caseopsis and another clade containing Alierasaurus, the other two species of Cotylorhynchus, and Lalieudorhynchus. Within the latter clade, Alierasaurus is the sister group of "Cotylorhynchus" bransoni and a more derived clade including Lalieudorhynchus and "Cotylorhynchus" hancocki.

Below is the cladogram published by Werneburg and colleagues in 2022.

- Caseidae
  - Martensius bromackerensis
  - - - Oromycter dolesorum
      - - Casea
        - - "Casea" nicholsi
          - - Euromycter
            - - Ennatosaurus
              - - Angelosaurus dolani
                - "Angelosaurus" romeri
                - - - Ruthenosaurus
                    - Caseopsis
                  - Cotylorhynchus romeri
                  - - Alierasaurus
                    - - "Cotylorhynchus" bransoni
                      - - Lalieudorhynchus
                        - "Cotylorhynchus" hancocki

== Paleobiology ==
=== Diet ===
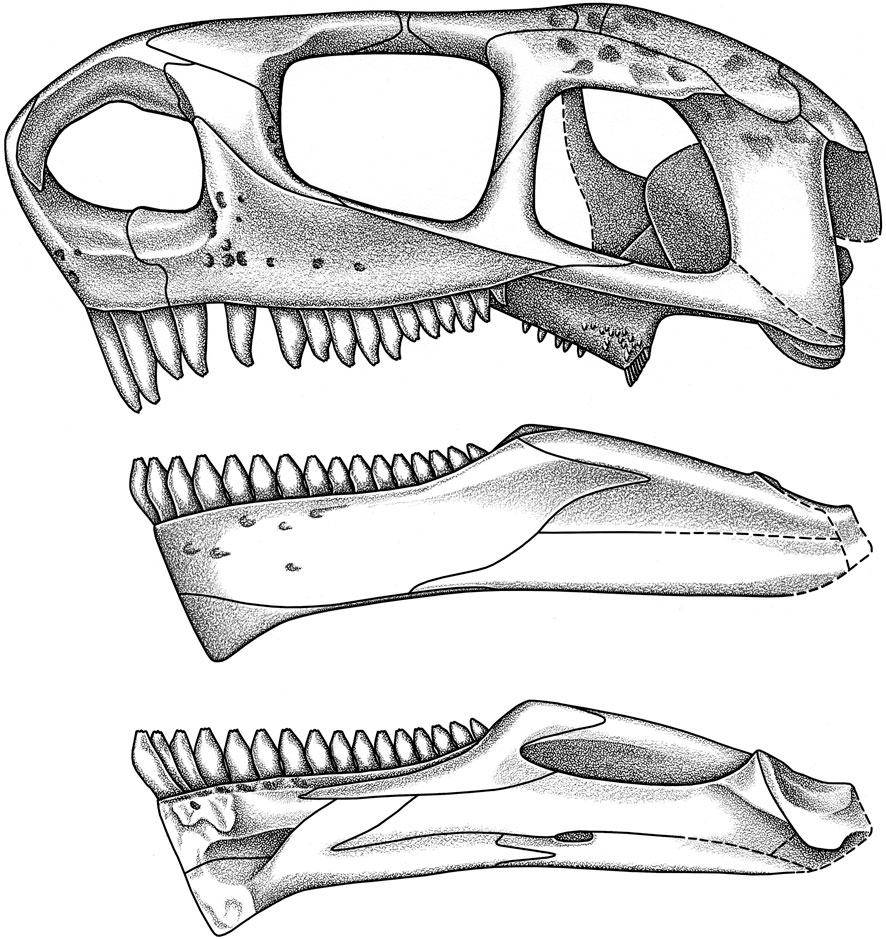
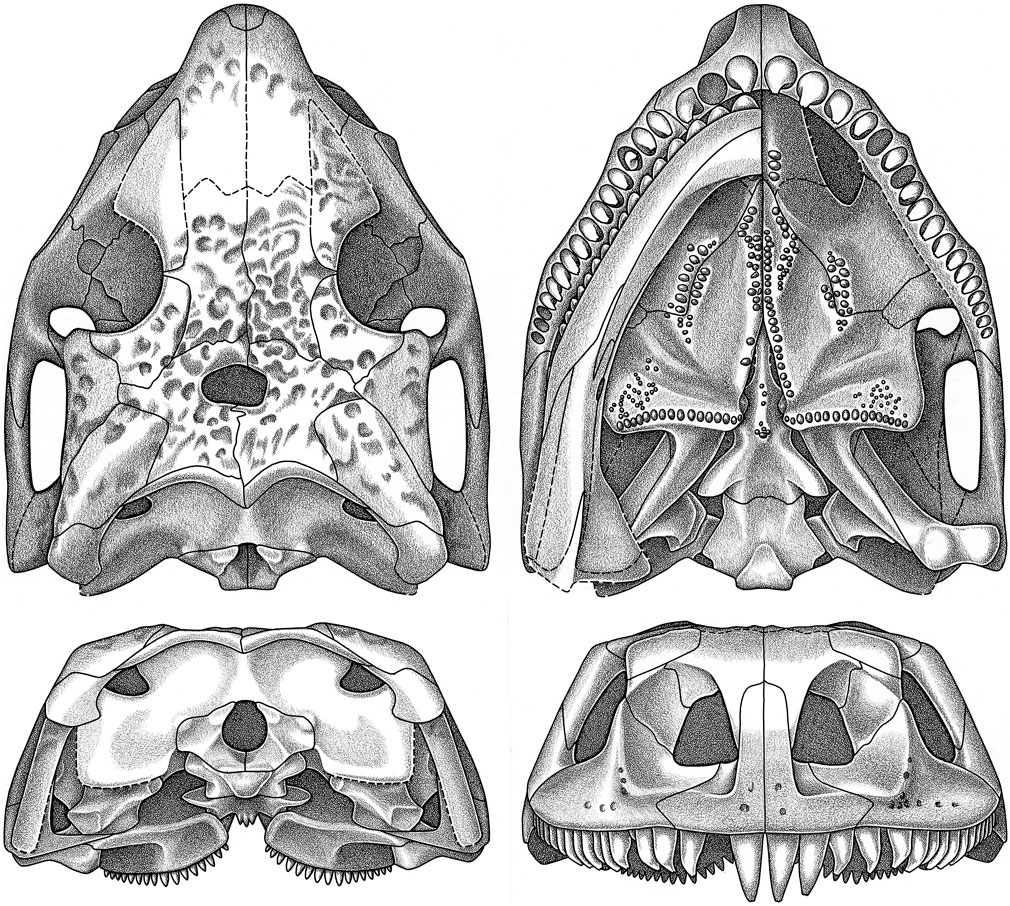
Cotylorhynchus romeri. Top : skull reconstruction in left lateral view, and medial and lateral views of mandible; bottom : skull reconstruction in dorsal, ventral, posterior and anterior views.

The highly developed, barrel-shaped rib cage indicates the presence of a massive digestive system suitable for ingesting large amounts of low-nutrient plants. The dentition of Cotylorhynchus also shows that it was clearly herbivorous. The front teeth, longer and slightly curved, probably served to gather vegetation in the mouth. The tricuspid marginal teeth were well suited for slicing and cutting vegetation. The hyoid apparatus preserved in some caseids (Euromycter and Ennatosaurus), indicates the existence of a relatively mobile massive tongue which must have worked in concert with the palatal teeth during swallowing. The tongue had to press the plant pieces against the palate in order to puncture the food with the large palatal teeth, an action which may have served to enhance the cellulolytic fermentation of food in the intestine. The low number of cuspules (three) on the teeth of Cotylorhynchus indicates that this genus was adapted to a different fodder (or range of fodder) than other herbivorous caseids having a greater number of cuspules (Angelosaurus, Euromycter and Ennatosaurus having respectively 5, 5 to 8, and 5 to 7 cuspules).

=== Terrestrial vs semiaquatic lifestyle ===
Cotylorhynchus and caseids in general are usually considered primarily terrestrial animals. Everett C. Olson in particular considered that the degree of ossification of the skeleton, the relatively short feet and hands, the massive claws, the limbs with very powerful extensor muscles, and the strong sacrum, strongly suggested a terrestrial lifestyle. Olson did not rule out that caseids spent some time in water, but he considered locomotion on land to be an important aspect of their lifestyle. It has been suggested that the very powerful forelimbs, with strong and very tendinous extensor muscles, as well as very massive claws, could be used to dig up roots or tubers. However, the very short neck implied a low amplitude of vertical movements of the head which precluded the large species from feeding at ground level. Another hypothesis suggests that the caseids could have used their powerful forelimbs to fold large plants towards them, which they would have torn off with their powerful claws. Other hypotheses suggest that some caseids such as Cotylorhynchus used their limbs with powerful claws to defend themselves against predators, or during intraspecific activities linked in particular to reproduction. According to Olson, an interesting thing about this, is that almost all known specimens of the species Cotylorhynchus hancocki have one to ten ribs broken and healed during life. Finally, for some authors, the large derived caseids would have been semiaquatic animals that used their hands with large claws like paddles, which could also be used to manipulate the plants on which they fed.

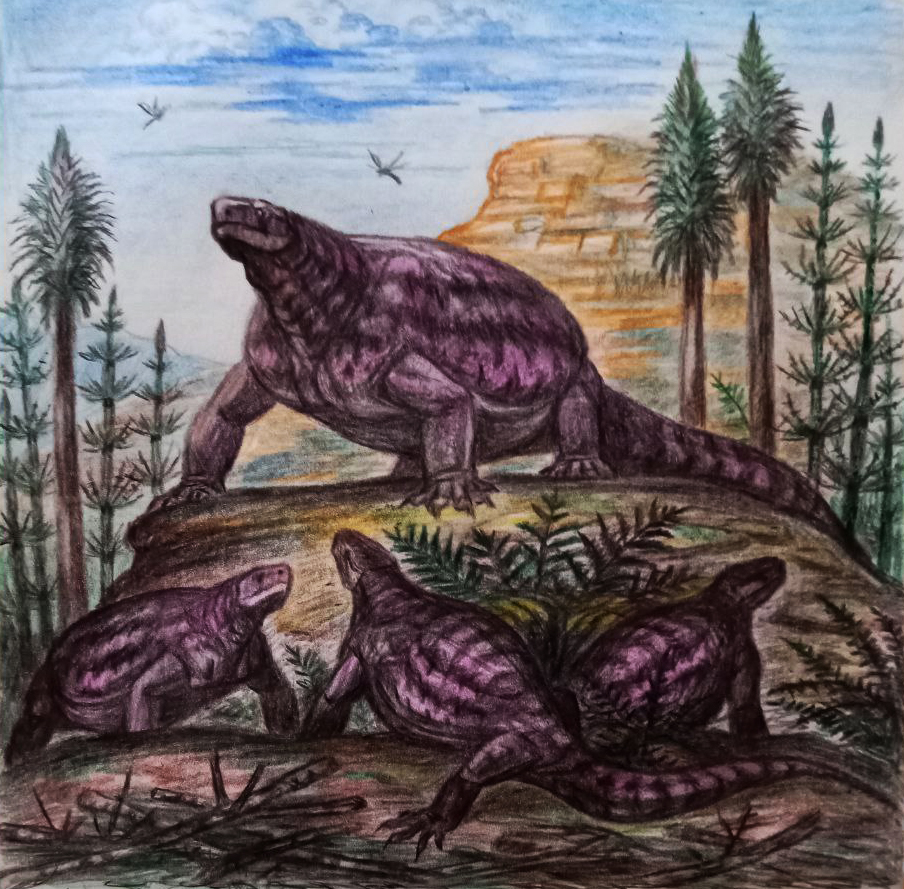
Restoration of C. romeri resting on land

Indeed, in 2016, Lambertz and colleagues questioned the terrestrial lifestyle of large caseids such as Cotylorhynchus. These authors showed that the bone microstructure of the humerus, femur, and ribs of adult and immature Cotylorhynchus specimens resembled that of aquatic animals rather than terrestrial animals, with a very spongy bone structure, with an extremely thin cortex, and the absence of distinct medullary cavities. This low bone density would have been a handicap for animals weighing several hundred kilograms, and with a strictly terrestrial lifestyle. Lambertz et al. also found that the joints between the vertebrae and the dorsal ribs only allowed small ranges of motion of the rib cage, thus limiting rib ventilation. To overcome this, they proposed that a proto-diaphragm was present to facilitate breathing, especially in aquatic environment. These authors also argued that the arid paleoclimates to which the caseid localities correspond are not incompatible with a semiaquatic lifestyle of these animals. These paleoenvironments included a significant number of aquatic habitats (rivers, lakes and lagoons). The arid conditions could have been the reason that the animals would sometimes have gathered and eventually died. In addition, arid environments have a low density of plants, which would require even more locomotor effort to find foods. For Lambertz et al., large caseids such as Cotylorhynchus were mainly aquatic animals that only came on dry land for the purposes of reproduction or thermoregulation.

This hypothesis is however disputed by Kenneth Angielczyk and Christian Kammerer as well as by Robert Reisz and colleagues based on paleontological and taphonomic data combined with the absence in these large caseids of morphological adaptations to an aquatic lifestyle. According to Angielczyk and Kammerer, the low bone density of caseids identified by Lambertz et al. does not resemble that of semiaquatic animals, which tend to have a more strongly ossified skeleton to provide passive buoyancy control and increased stability against current and wave action. Cotylorhynchus bone microstructure is more similar to what is seen in animals living in the open ocean, such as cetaceans and pinnipeds, which emphasize high maneuverability, rapid acceleration and hydrodynamic control of buoyancy. However, the caseid morphology was totally incompatible with a pelagic lifestyle. Thus, due to these unusual data, Angielczyk and Kammerer consider that the available evidence is still insufficient to question the more widely assumed terrestrial lifestyle of caseids. According to Reisz and colleagues the presence of numerous skeletons of the amphibian Brachydectes preserved in estivation and of the lungfish Gnathorhiza, another well-known aestivator, combined with the absence of obligate aquatic vertebrates strongly suggests that the Hennessey fauna lived in a dry habitat periodically punctuated by monsoons. Combined with the fact that Cotylorhynchus shows no morphological adaptations to an aquatic lifestyle, these authors consider it as a terrestrial animal that had to endure monsoon rains, with some individuals occasionally succumbing to major floods.

In 2022, Werneburg and colleagues proposed a somewhat different semiaquatic lifestyle, in which large caseids like Lalieudorhynchus (whose bone texture is even more osteoporotic than that of Cotylorhynchus) would be ecological equivalents of modern hippos, passing part of their time in the water (being underwater walkers rather than swimming animals) but coming on land for food.

== Stratigraphic distribution ==
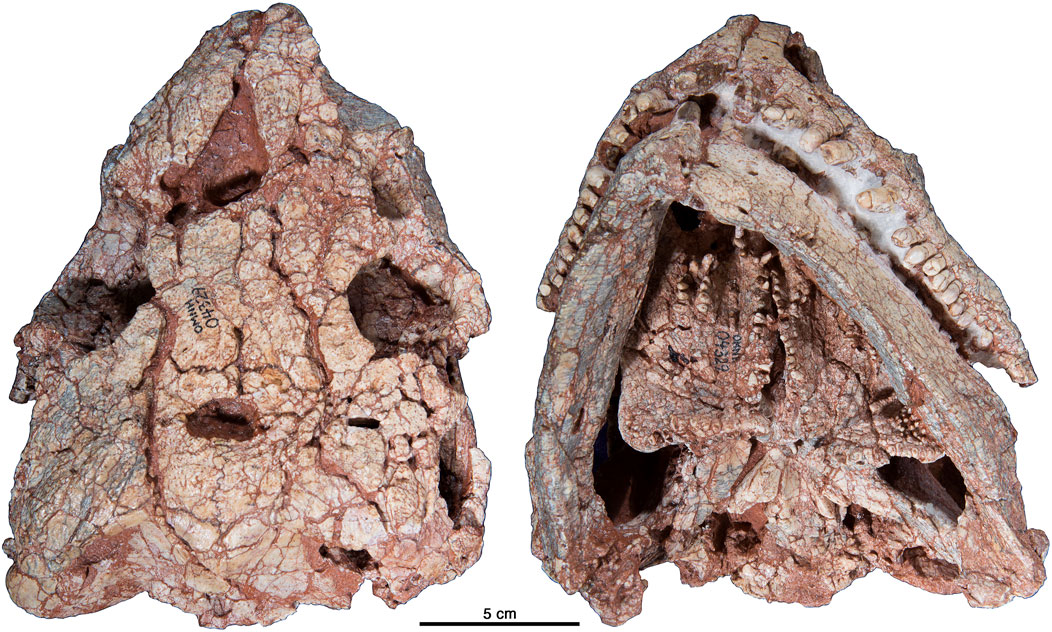
Cotylorhynchus romeri, specimen OMNH 04329. Skull in dorsal (allowing to see the large pineal foramen) and ventral views.

No radiometric dating is available for the geological formations containing Cotylorhynchus fossils. The oldest species is C. romeri from the Hennessey Formation in Oklahoma. This formation is considered contemporary with the upper part of the Clear Fork Group (Choza Formation) of Texas. Ammonoid faunas found in marine strata present at the base and top of the Clear Fork Group indicate that the three formations that compose it (Arroyo, Vale, and Choza) are entirely included in the Kungurian.

The other two species of Cotylorhynchus are younger and come from the San Angelo and Chickasha formations. The estimation of the geological age of these two formations has been the subject of many interpretations, these alternatively assigning them a late Cisuralian (Kungurian) and/or basal Guadalupian (Roadian) age.

In Texas, the species Cotylorhynchus hancocki comes from the San Angelo Formation. This formation overlies the Clear Fork Group and is overlain by the Blaine Formation. According to Spencer G. Lucas and colleagues, fusulins found in a marine intercalation of the San Angelo Formation, as well as ammonoids present at the base of the overlying Blaine Formation, indicated a Kungurian age. Moreover, according to these authors, the base of the San Andres Formation, located further west and considered a lateral equivalent of the Blaine Formation, is in the Neostreptognathodus prayi conodont zone, the second of the three Kungurian conodont biozones. The base of the Blaine Formation would therefore belong to this Kungurian biozone, suggesting that the underlying San Angelo Formation and C. hancocki would be slightly older than the N. prayi conodont zone with a lower Kungurian age. However, Michel Laurin and Robert W. Hook argued that the fusuline marine intercalation cited above does not belong to the San Angelo Formation in which it was mistakenly included, and cannot be used to date the latter. The name San Angelo Formation has been incorrectly applied to a wide variety of rocks in various sedimentary basins located in western Texas, whereas the San Angelo Formation is restricted to the eastern shelf and is exclusively continental and devoid of marine fossils. On the other hand, the taxonomic revision of the ammonoids from the base of the Blaine Formation indicates a Roadian age rather than a Kungurian age (Note: Taken individually, the seven genera of ammonoids of this fauna have a temporal distribution extending from the Cisuralian to the Lopingian: three are known from the Cisuralian and Guadalupian deposits, two extend from the Cisuralian to the Lopingian, and two are recorded in the Guadalupian to lower Lopingian rocks. However, the Roadian (base of the Guadalupian) is the only stage during which the seven genera coexist.) and the San Angelo formation yielded a fossil flora dominated by voltzian conifers, an assemblage rather characteristic of the Guadalupian and the Lopingian. Thus, according to Laurin and Hook, the San Angelo Formation could date from latest Kungurian or earliest Roadian, or more likely could straddle the Kungurian/Roadian boundary.

Cotylorhynchus bransoni is the youngest species of the genus and comes from the Chickasha Formation in Oklahoma. This formation was long considered contemporary with the San Angelo Formation. However, Laurin and Hook demonstrated that the Chickasha Formation is slightly younger because it is intercalated within the central part of the Flowerpot Formation, which overlies the Duncan Sandstone Formation, the latter being in fact the lateral equivalent of the San Angelo Formation in Oklahoma. Magnetostratigraphic data suggest that the Chickasha Formation probably dates from the early Roadian. A Roadian age was also suggested based on the presence in the Chickasha fauna of the nycteroleterid parareptile Macroleter, a genus that was only known from the Middle Permian of European Russia. However, Sigi Maho and colleagues have pointed out that several genera of Permian tetrapods had a wide temporal distribution, such as Dimetrodon and Diplocaulus, and that the presence of the genus Macroleter in both Russia and Oklahoma (represented by two different species) is not an evidence of a middle Permian age for the Chickasha Formation. The same authors also point to the example of the varanopid Mesenosaurus, which is present both in the Middle Permian of European Russia and by a separate species in Oklahoma, in a locality radiometrically dated to the early Permian (Artinskian). Additionally, probable nycteroleterid footprints, named Pachypes ollieri, from Cisuralian rocks of Europe and North America and from the Guadalupian of Europe, show that the stratigraphic distribution of Nycteroleteridae was not restricted to the middle and late Permian but also included the early Permian. Cisuralian occurrences of P. ollieri come from the Hermit (Arizona), Rabéjac (France) and Peranera (Spain) formations, all of Artinskian age, and also from the San Angelo Formation. Thus, in the current state of knowledge, the age of the Chickasha Formation can hardly be assessed from its fauna. However, the stratigraphic position of the Chickasha Formation compared to that of the San Angelo Formation, and its probable early Roadian age inferred by magnetostratigraphy, indicate that the Chickasha fauna represents the most recent Permian faunal assemblage of North America.

== Paleoenvironments ==
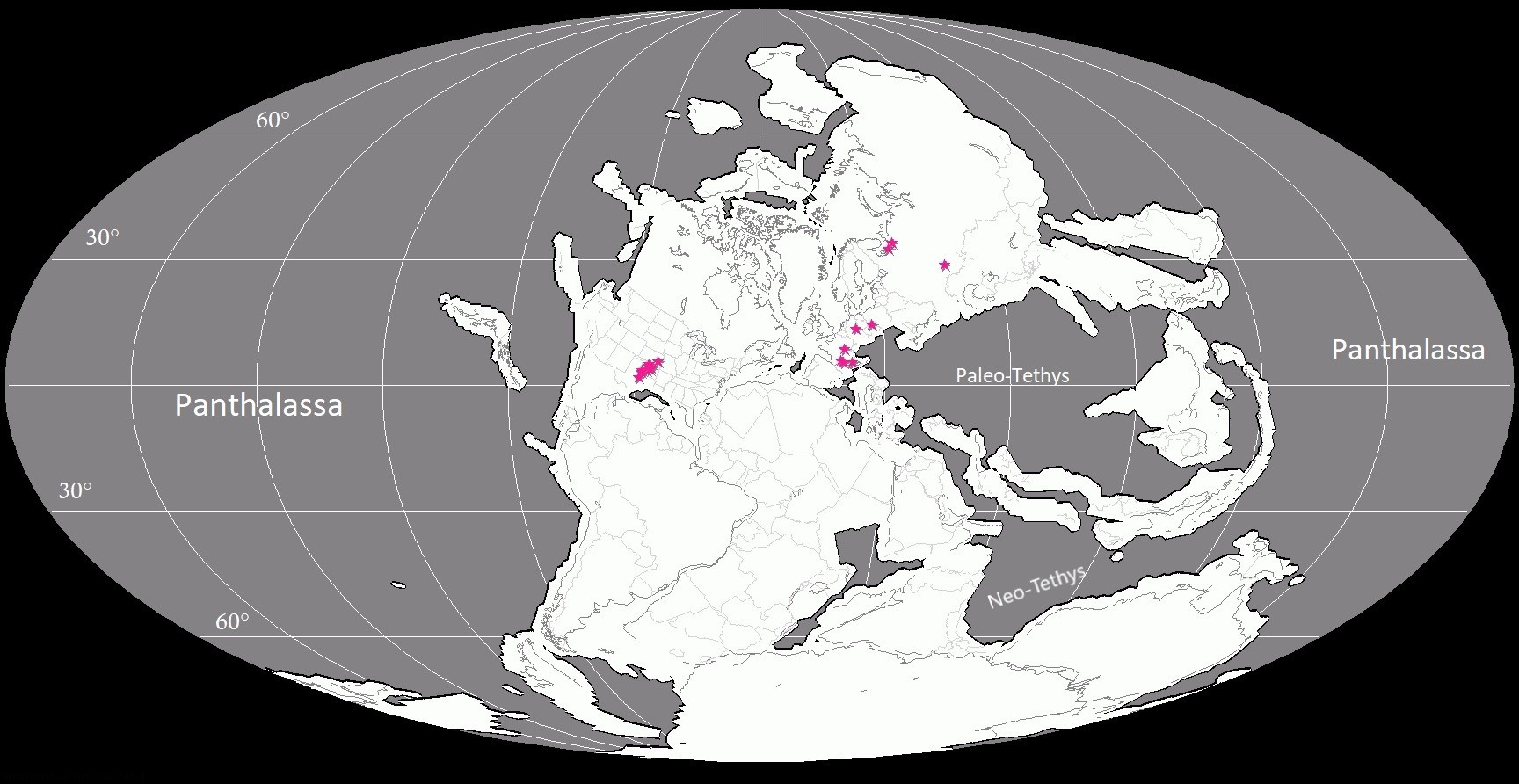
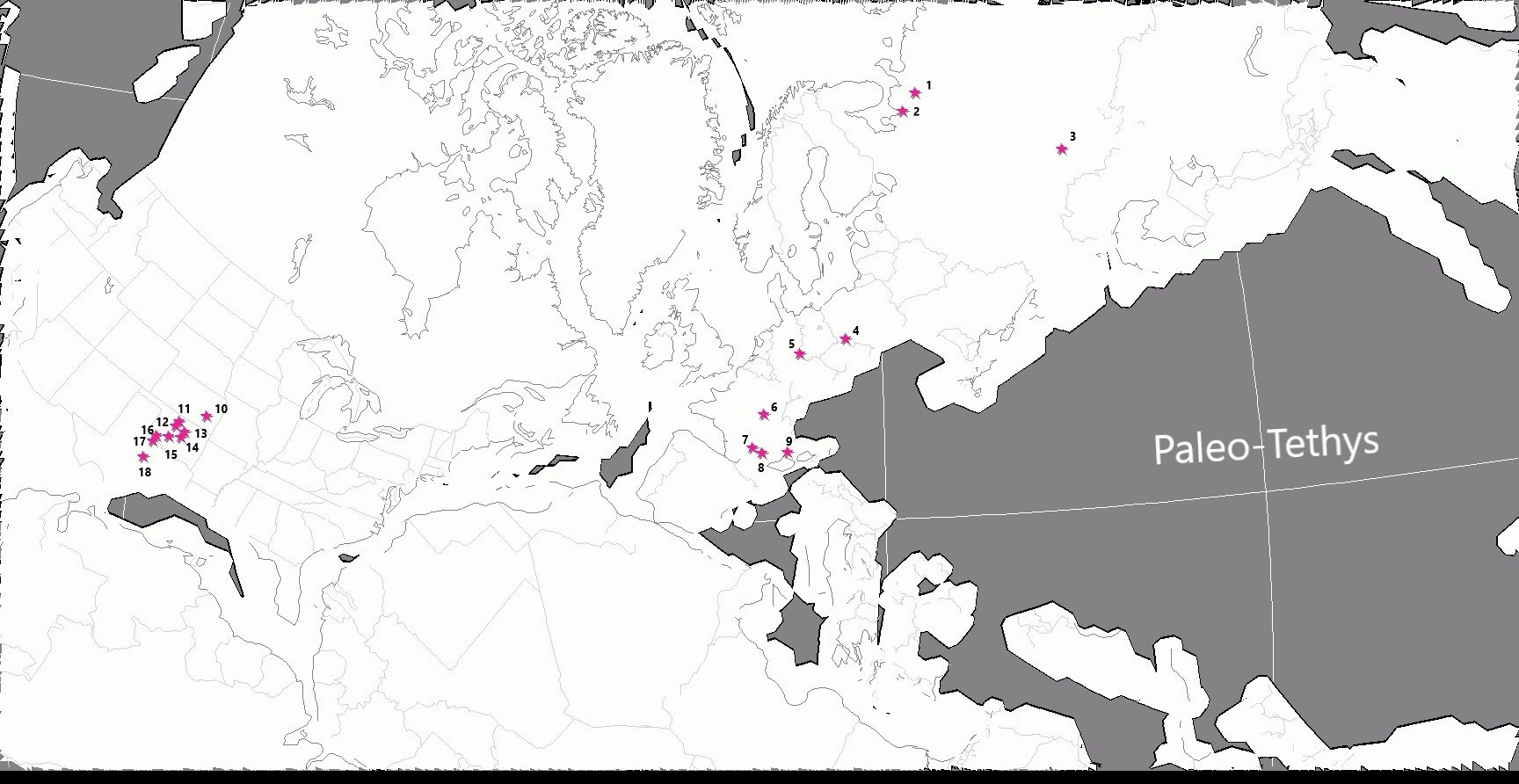
Left: paleogeographic map of Earth at the end of the Paleozoic showing the known distribution of caseid synapsids. Right: close-up of the paleogeographic location of the caseid sites. 1 and 2 Ennatosaurus tecton, Arkhangelsk Oblast, Russia, late Roadian – early Wordian; 3 Phreatophasma aenigmaticum, Bashkortostan, Russia, early Roadian; 4 Datheosaurus macrourus Lower Silesian Voivodeship, Poland, Gzhelian; 5 Martensius bromackerensis, Thuringia, Germany, Sakmarian; 6 Callibrachion gaudryi, Saône-et-Loire, France, Asselian; 7 Euromycter rutenus and Ruthenosaurus russellorum, Aveyron, France, late Artinskian; 8 Lalieudorhynchus gandi, Hérault, France, Wordian – early Capitanian; 9 Alierasaurus ronchii, Nurra, Sardinia, Italy, Roadian; 10 Eocasea martini, Greenwood County, Kansas, late Pennsylvanian; 11 Angelosaurus romeri and Cotylorhynchus bransoni, Kingfisher County, Oklahoma, early Roadian; 12 Cotylorhynchus bransoni, Blaine County, Oklahoma, early Roadian; 13 Cotylorhynchus romeri, Logan County, Oklahoma, mid-late Kungurian; 14 Cotylorhynchus romeri, Cleveland County, Oklahoma, mid-late Kungurian; 15 Oromycter dolesorum and Arisierpeton simplex, Comanche County, Oklahoma, early Artinskian; 16 Cotylorhynchus hancocki, Hardeman County, Texas, late Kungurian – early Roadian; 17 Cotylorhynchus hancocki, Angelosaurus dolani, A. greeni, Caseoides sanangeloensis, and Caseopsis agilis, Knox County, Texas, late Kungurian – early Roadian; 18 Casea broilii, Baylor County, Texas, mid-late Kungurian.

In the Permian, most of the landmasses were united in a single supercontinent, Pangea. It was then roughly C-shaped: its northern (Laurasia) and southern (Gondwana) parts were connected to the west but separated to the east by the Tethys Ocean. A long string of microcontinents, grouped under the name of Cimmeria, divided the Tethys in two : the Paleo-Tethys in the north, and the Neo-Tethys in the south. The Hennessey, San Angelo, and Chickasha formations correspond mainly to fluvial and aeolian sediments deposited in a vast deltaic plain dotted with lakes and lagoons. This coastal plain was bordered to the west by a sea that occupied what is today the Gulf of Mexico and the southernmost part of North America. The rivers ending in the delta came from modest reliefs located further east and corresponding to the ancestral uplifts of the Ouachita, Arbuckle and Wichita mountains. The climate was subtropical with moderate and seasonal rains. There was a summer monsoon as well as a dry winter season. The monsoon was relatively weak, due to the limited size of the sea and the small differential between summer and winter temperatures. The presence of evaporites indicates significant aridity interrupted by seasonal flooding.

=== Hennessey Formation ===
Everett C. Olson thought that the Hennessey Formation was represented by several sedimentary facies corresponding to several types of environments. According to him, part of the formation would have been deposited in a marine environment while other parts would represent coastal and continental deposits. The continental facies is mostly composed of red mudstones, locally accompanied by lenses and beds of sandstones and siltstones interpreted as fluvial and floodplain deposits. However, detailed facies analyses later revealed that these rocks were more likely of aeolian origin, corresponding to silts, clays, and sands deposited as loess and sometimes trapped in mud flat, shallow salt lakes or wadi-type ephemeral streams. The fossils of Cotylorhynchus romeri are only found in red mudstones. This species occurs partly in the form of almost complete skeletons but also in the form of dislocated skeletons and articulated segments of skeletons. Based on the position of the articulated skeletons, Stovall and colleagues estimated that the animals were probably stuck in marshes or swamps where they were buried. The dislocated or partially articulated skeletons also indicate that other specimens have undergone some transport prior to burial. According to Lambertz and colleagues, it is also possible that the animals became bogged down when the waterhole in which they lived dried up, in the hypothesis of a semiaquatic lifestyle in Cotylorhynchus.

Apart from C. romeri, other known vertebrates in the Hennessey Formation are the Captorhinidae Captorhinikos chozaensis and Rhodotheratus parvus, the lungfish Gnathorhiza, and the amphibians Diplocaulus, Brachydectes, Rhynchonkos, Aletrimyti, and Dvellacanus. Gnathorhiza and Brachydectes were able to aestivate in burrows during prolonged periods of aridity. Rare vertebrate tracks have been attributed to the ichnogenera Amphisauropus and Dromopus, considered to be seymouriamorph amphibian and araeoscelid reptile footprints respectively. Amphisauropus tracks from the Hennessey Formation have however been reclassified in the ichnogenus Hyloidichnus, which corresponds to footprints of captorhinid eureptiles.

=== San Angelo Formation ===
The San Angelo Formation is composed at its base of unfossiliferous hard, green, gray and brown sandstones and fine conglomerates. The central part of the formation consists mainly of red mudstones corresponding to clayey and silty mud deposited in coastal plains during periodic flooding episodes. These red mudstones are interspersed with a thin level of green sandstone, sandy shales, and evaporites. These correspond to a minor and ephemeral encroachment of estuaries, lagoons, and very shallow seas on the terrestrial part of the delta. The caseids Angelosaurus dolani and Caseoides sanangeloensis are present in the red mudstones of this part of the formation. (Note: From these levels also come the very fragmentary genera Steppesaurus and Mastersonia. In 1953, Olson and Beerbower first classified Steppesaurus among the sphenacodontid pelycosaurs. Then in 1962 Olson considered it a phtinosuchid therapsid. In the same article Olson described "Mastersonia" which he considered an "eodinocephalian" therapsid. In a short note published in 1995, Sidor and Hopson rejected the therapsid nature of these two taxa, their remains according to them belonging to pelycosaurs. Laurin and Hook (2022), however, emphasize the need to re-study these specimens with modern methods.) The upper part of the San Angelo Formation is characterized by the preponderance of coarse sediments such as sandstones and conglomerates, but also including at its base sandy mudstones and at its top pure red mudstones. According to Olson, these sediments were deposited by wider and more powerful rivers than those of the central part of the formation. However, in Oklahoma, strata equivalent to the San Angelo Formation, which were also considered fluvio-deltaic and coastal deposits, have been reinterpreted as being of aeolian origin. This level is characterized by the absence of the genus Angelosaurus and by the abundance of Cotylorhynchus hanckoki. The latter is most often represented by a single individual in each locality, with the exception of the Kahn quarry. This site has yielded many specimens distributed in several stratigraphic levels. The richest level, consisting of green, sometimes brown, sandy mudstones has provided the remains of at least 15 individuals. Several are partially articulated while others are represented by isolated bones. After being transported to the site, some bones remained exposed on the surface for some time, as indicated by the presence, on some of them, of a thin silt layer very different from the rest of the matrix. Several bones indicate that some carcasses were partially devoured. The taphonomy of the site therefore indicates that the corpses of C. hancocki were transported during a flooding episode, deposited as the waters receded, subjected to the action of predators and scavengers, and then buried later may be during a new flood. A process that would have been repeated several times. Large masses of vegetation have also been transported and have been found in direct association with vertebrates. The fauna of the upper San Angelo Formation includes, among others, (Note: Olson and Beerbower (1953) and then Olson (1962) named other fragmentary taxa from Kahn's quarry and neighboring localities of the same age which they assigned to various groups of therapsids, such as Knoxosaurus, Gorgodon, Dimacrodon, Eosyodon, Driveria, and Tappenosaurus. In 1995 Sidor and Hopson reinterpreted the fossils of all these taxa as more or less determinable caseid and sphenacodontid pelycosaur remains. However, a new study of these specimens by modern methods would be necessary (Laurin and Hook, 2022).) the caseid Caseopsis agilis and Angelosaurus greeni, the sphenacodontid Dimetrodon angelensis, the captorhinids Rothianiscus multidonta, and Kahneria seltina, and the tupilakosaurid dvinosaur Slaugenhopia. A few tetrapod tracks also indicate the presence of a nycteroleterid pareiasauromorpha (ichnotaxon Pachypes ollieri), a partial skeleton of which is known from slightly younger deposits of the Chickasha Formation. Unusual flora has been found in the channels of the upper San Angelo formation. It is dominated by gymnosperms and is remarkable for its unique composition including both typical Lower Permian taxa such as Walchia or Culmitzschia but also forms that were previously known only in middle or late Permian rocks as various species of Ulmannia, Pseudovoltzia liebeana, and the taxon of uncertain affinity Taeniopteris eckardtii, or in Mesozoic strata such as the bennettitale Podozamites and the putative Cycadidae Dioonitocarpidium. The rest of the flora is represented by the ginkgoale Dicranophyllum, the cordaitale Cordaites, and the equisetale cf. Neocalamites.

=== Chickasha Formation ===
The Chickasha Formation corresponds to the central part of the Flowerpot Formation in which it is locally inserted. The sediments that compose it are varied and include red shales, sandstones, mudstones, conglomerates, and evaporites, deposited in floodplains and channels bordering the sea and coastal lagoons. In the Omega quarry, all the fossils come from sandstones, mudstones and hard, siliceous conglomerates, arranged in lenses. They correspond to channel deposits where the skeletons of Cotylorhynchus bransoni have accumulated, but also those of a second caseid, Angelosaurus romeri, and those of the captorhinid Rothianiscus robustus. Elsewhere in this formation are known the xenacanth Orthacanthus, the Nectridea Diplocaulus, the dissorophid temnospondyl Nooxobeia, the nycteroleterid Macroleter and the varanopids Varanodon and Watongia .

== See also ==
- List of pelycosaurs
