= Angelosaurus =

Angelosaurus Temporal range: late Kungurian - early Roadian, 279.5–270 Ma

Scientific classification
- Kingdom: Animalia
- Phylum: Chordata
- Clade: Synapsida
- Clade: †Caseasauria
- Family: †Caseidae
- Genus: †Angelosaurus; Olson & Berrbower, 1953

Species
- A. dolani (type)Olson & Berrbower, 1953; A. greeni Olson, 1962; A. romeri Olson and Barghuser, 1962

Extinct genus of synapsids

Angelosaurus is an extinct genus of herbivorous caseid synapsids that lived during the late Lower Permian (Kungurian) and early Middle Permian (Roadian) in what is now Texas and Oklahoma. Like other herbivorous caseids, it had a small head, large barrel-shaped body, long tail, and massive limbs. Angelosaurus differs from other caseids by the extreme massiveness of its bones, particularly those of the limbs, which show a strong development of ridges, processes, and rugosities for the attachment of muscles and tendons. Relative to its body size, the limbs of Angelosaurus were shorter and wider than those of other caseids. The ungual phalanges looked more like hooves than claws. The few known cranial elements show that the skull was short and more robust than that of the other representatives of the group. Angelosaurus is also distinguished by its bulbous teeth with shorter and wider crowns than those of other caseids. Their morphology and the high rate of wear they exhibit suggests a diet quite different from that of other large herbivorous caseids, and must have been based on particularly tough plants. A study published in 2022 suggests that the genus may be paraphyletic, with Angelosaurus possibly only represented by its type species A. dolani.

== Etymology ==
The name of the genus Angelosaurus refers to the San Angelo Formation in Texas, where this animal was first discovered. It is completed by saurus meaning lizard.

== Species ==
Angelosaurus is only known from incomplete skeletons and isolated bones. The genus is represented by three species, the largest, Angelosaurus greeni, reaching a size comparable to that of Cotylorhynchus romeri. Angelosaurus romeri was the smallest species and A. dolani was of intermediate size. However, the difference in size is not a relevant taxonomic criterion because the number of known specimens is too limited to know the maximum size reached by each species. These three species differ essentially in characteristics of the humerus, femur, and pelvis, which are the only bones allowing comparisons. In the type species A. dolani, the humerus is very massive, as long as it is wide with an almost nonexistent shaft. In A. romeri, the humerus is less massive with a very short but distinct shaft. In A. romeri and A. dolani, the internal trochanter is located more or less halfway between the proximal and distal ends of the intertrochanteric fossa, while in A. greeni it is located near the distal end of the fossa. A. romeri is distinguished by the prominence of the fourth trochanter. In A. romeri and A. greeni, the external condyle is the larger of the two and is well separated from the internal condyle. In A. dolani the internal condyle is the most developed but the separation with the external condyle is less clear, probably due to the presence of an extensive cartilage cover. The pelvis of A. dolani is characterized both by the massiveness of the vertebral connections and the strong fusion of the sacral ribs forming a single plate distally, but also by the weak ossification of the dorsal lamina of the ilium and the pubic symphysis. In A. romeri there is practically no fusion of the sacral ribs. The sacrum of A. dolani has three vertebrae of which only the first two are fused. In A. romeri, the pubic symphysis is strongly ossified and the sacrum has four vertebrae. In the holotype, the three preserved vertebrae of the sacrum are fused together. Phylogenetic analysis by Werneburg and colleagues, however, indicates that the species A. greeni and A. romeri may not belong to the genus Angelosaurus, all these taxa requiring a detailed redescription.

=== Angelosaurus dolani ===
The type species Angelosaurus dolani was erected in 1953 by Everett C. Olson and James R. Beerbower from a partial skeleton (the holotype FMNH UR 149) found in the red mudstones constituting the central part of the San Angelo Formation (Pease River Group), Knox County, Texas. This species was named in honor of Wayne Dolan, whose cooperation made it possible to continue work on the Little Crotton Creek locality, near the town of Benjamin where the holotype came from. The skeleton of A. dolani was largely articulated, with the first three presacral vertebrae, the sacrum and 24 caudal vertebrae being anatomically connected, as were the left pelvis, femurs, left tibia and fibula, and most of the left foot. Four other vertebrae, the right humerus, parts of the right manus, ribs fragments, two poorly preserved fragments of dentary and maxilla with broken teeth, were scattered anterior to the pelvis. A few vertebrae of a second specimen were also reported from the same site, less than a hundred meters of the first site.

A. dolani is characterized by a heavy and massive skeleton, with shorter and wider limbs than those of other caseids. The humerus is one of the most distinctive elements of the skeleton by its extremely massive proportions. There is virtually no shaft, and the width of the proximal end is almost equal to the total length of the bone. The delto-pectoral crest is highly developed and bears a prominent, knotty and rough process for the insertion of part of the pectoral musculature. Along the anterior margin of the proximal part of the humerus there is a strong ridge for the insertion of the deltoid muscle. The radial condyle of the humerus lies far anteriorly on the ventral and distal surface, and its proportions suggest that the head of the radius was massive. The femur is very massive with a deep and heavy proximal end. The internal trochanter is exceptionally strong and has a rough surface. Characteristically, it extends very close to the proximal end of the intertrochanteric fossa (a large concave surface located on the ventral side of the proximal end of the femur and where the puboischiofemoralis externus muscle inserted). The fourth trochanter, on the other hand, is weak. The distal condyles of the femur are large but not strongly differentiated, probably due to the presence of a cartilaginous cap. A strong ridge passes proximally from the intercondylar fossa along the dorsal margin of the femur and continues over the area where the femoro-tibial portion of the triceps surae muscle likely originated. Like the femur, the tibia and fibula are characterized by their ends formed of unfinished bone, suggesting the presence of a substantial cartilage cover. This peculiarity, which is usually a sign of skeletal immaturity, is surprising because the holotype of A. dolani belongs to an adult animal as indicated by the complete ossification of various other parts of the skeleton. On the left foot, relatively large compared to the size of the body, the tarsal bones were found articulated but the metatarsals and phalanges were somewhat disarticulated. So Olson and Beerbower had some difficulty in determining the phalangeal formula. After re-examining the material discovered, Olson later assessed the phalangeal formula of the foot to be 2-2-2-3-3. The ungual phalanges are distinguished from those of other caseids by being short, broad, and smooth, and resemble hooves rather than claws. Some elements of the right manus show that the phalanges were wide and short. The pelvis is characterized by a pubis and ischium forming a broad flattened plate, with a weak symphysis for most of its length. The ilium, short and broad, shows some indication of the dorsal elevation characteristic of caseids, but the apex appears incomplete, possibly cartilaginous. The acetabulum is proportionately very wide and deep. The sacrum is composed of three vertebrae, the first and the second being fused together. The distal ends of the three sacral ribs are fused to form a broad plate that fits over the ilium. The thoracic vertebrae have relatively long transverse processes and there appears to have been a small ventral facet, indicating that the ribs were double-headed. The neural spines, although poorly preserved, appear to have been rather short. Two fragments of the upper and lower jaws indicate that the skull was rather small in relation to the size of the body, as is the case in other derived caseids. The two fragments of dentary and maxilla bear a few teeth which, although broken, had an ovoid section and were quite spaced, indicating that their total number should be low.

=== Angelosaurus greeni ===
Angelosaurus greeni was named in 1962 by Everett C. Olson from a very fragmentary skeleton and various isolated elements found in red mudstones at the top of the San Angelo Formation in Knox County, Texas. (Note: These mudstones were initially attributed by Olson (1962) to the lower part of the Flowerpot Formation. In 1974, Gary E. Smith redefined these mudstones as forming the top of the San Angelo Formation.) The specific epithet honors J. Green of the Alexander Ranch, whose cooperation and assistance during many years has made it possible to explore and collect the fossiliferous beds outcropping on the lands of the Alexander Ranch. It is the largest species of the genus with dimensions comparable to that of the caseid Cotylorhynchus romeri. It is also the most poorly known species. The remains found were fragmentary, in large part due to an extensive chemical decomposition after burial. In the holotype, this decomposition has altered and destroyed many elements of an originally more complete skeleton, as indicated by the presence of many fragments that are difficult to identify, but also the presence on the ground of the indistinct outline of some fully dissolved bones. The holotype (FMNH UR 257) is composed of a femur, some vertebrae, and fragments of ribs. Paratypes include a distal end fragment of a humerus (FMNH UR 258), pelvic fragments, distal limb elements, and indeterminate fragments (FMNH UR 264), and a flattened humerus with poorly preserved distal end (FMNH UR 259), all coming from the same general horizon and the same locality as the type.

This species is mainly characterized by the morphology of its femur. The location of the internal trochanter is very characteristic in being located near the distal end of the intertrochanteric fossa. While it is located near the middle or proximal part of this fossa in the other two species. This internal trochanter is apparently fused with the fourth trochanter. There is no adductor ridge. The anterior (internal) distal condyle is small and is sharply separated from the posterior by a deep groove. Finally, the shaft of the femur is very short.

=== Angelosaurus romeri ===
Angelosaurus romeri was named in 1962 by Everett C. Olson and Herbert Barghusen from a partial skeleton and many other isolated elements found in the Omega Quarry in Kingfisher County, Oklahoma. Its remains were originally described as coming from the central part of the Flowerpot Formation. Olson later corrected this attribution by specifying that these remains belong to a tongue of the Chickasha Formation (El Reno Group) whose deposits interfinger in places with those of the Flowerpot, Blaine, and Dog Creek formations. Although Olson and Barghusen give no information on the name of the species, it probably refers to the American paleontologist Alfred Sherwood Romer. Another species of caseid already bore his name, Cotylorhynchus romeri. A. romeri is the better known species of the genus, and the only one for which various parts of the skull are available. It is the smallest species of the genus and differs from its cousins by a moderate development of the massiveness of the limbs and a weak increase in the robustness of the vertebrae, which can only be distinguished with difficulty from those of Cotylorhynchus.

The holotype (FMNH UR 827) is composed of the pelvis, the right femur, 16 presacral vertebrae, five of which have their associated ribs, 3 sacral, and 4 caudals, two of which are associated with chevrons. Also known are two sacral vertebrae and 2 presacral vertebrae forming an articulated series (FMNH UR 828), the right side of a pelvis lacking most of the ischium (FMNH UR 844), a right pubis (FMNH UR 845), an interclavicle (FMNH UR 846), two anterior dorsal ribs (FMNH UR 847 and 850), two median dorsal ribs (FMNH UR 848 and 849), a posterior dorsal rib (FMNH UR 851), a cervical rib (FMNH UR 852), four anterior caudal vertebrae (FMNH UR 853), and a fragment of premaxilla with two teeth (FMNH UR 854).

Subsequent excavations in the Omega quarry have uncovered many additional bones, including several previously unknown skeletal elements. This additional material includes a partial skeleton composed of the sacrum, 4 sacral vertebrae, 3 presacral, 18 caudal, and toe bones (FMNH UR 904), a right scapulocoracoid and a right humerus (FMNH UR 907), 20 presacral vertebrae (FMNH UR 908), a left scapulocoracoid (FMNH UR 909), a poorly preserved tibia (FMNH UR 911, doubtfully attributed to this taxon), 4 bones of the toes (FMNH UR 914), 3 presacral vertebrae with ribs (FMNH UR 916), a large left femur (FMNH UR 917), a fragment of maxilla with 2 teeth (FMNH UR 926), a braincase and part of the palate (FMNH UR 927), a large rib (FMNH UR 928), a pterygoid (FMNH UR 931), an anterior dorsal rib (FMNH UR 932), a clavicle (FMNH UR 933), the third presacral rib (FMNH UR 940), an anterior dorsal rib (FMNH UR 941), an isolated tooth (FMNH UR 942), a pair of articulated lower jaws having retained their tooth rows (FMNH UR 943), 2 median dorsal ribs (FM NH UR 944), several anterior dorsal ribs (FMNH UR 945), 20 caudal vertebrae with ribs on the most anterior (FMNH UR 971), a pubis (FMNH UR 978), ilia and ischia of juvenile individuals (FMNH UR 979), and a left and right pelvis (FMNH UR 980).

No complete skull of Angelosaurus has yet been discovered. The species A. romeri provides the best picture of the cranial morphology in this genus. The skull is represented by an incomplete premaxilla with two teeth, a fragment of maxilla with two teeth, a braincase, a pterygoid, and a pair of lower jaws bearing an almost complete dentition. All these elements are consistent with each other indicating a fairly short, robust and heavy skull, with strong short teeth. The morphology of the skull in lateral view is not well known, but the premaxilla shows that the external nares were large, and the fragment of maxilla shows the existence of a large orbit. These two fragments suggest that the elements of the skull were quite massive compared to those of Cotylorhynchus of comparable size. The skull of A. romeri must have looked like a slightly more solid and robust version of the basic pattern of the other derived caseids. The lower jaws show that the dentary is short and heavy with a strong symphysis. There is a moderately strong and wide shelf at the ventral margin of the symphysis.

The teeth of A. romeri differs very clearly from that of other caseids by their bulbous morphology with very short and wide crowns. The knowledge of the upper dentition is limited to four teeth, two being carried by an incomplete premaxilla and two others coming from a fragment of maxilla. The first premaxillary tooth is very different from that of other caseids genera, in being thick at the base and tapering to a blunt termination of the crown. The second tooth is similar in shape, but much smaller. Neither have cusps. The two maxillary teeth have a general structure similar to that of other derived caseids by having a base with a circular section, followed at the mid-height of the tooth by an enlargement of the crown, which then ends in a labio-lingual thinning giving to the upper end of the crown a spatulate morphology. However, they differ from those of other caseids in being shorter and blunter, the crown ending in a flattened edge bearing five small longitudinal cusps. The pair of lower jaws retains a much more complete dentition. The three anterior teeth are very distinctive. They are very short and blunt with a very broad middle part, and lack cusps. The more posterior teeth are short and resemble the upper ones quite closely. The five cusps on the flattened dorsal margin of the crowns are very distinct. There are 11 teeth on the right side and 12 on the left, counting as present those which are being replaced. Apparently 12 is the correct number, the lowest number of teeth among the caseids from North America. Only the Russian genus Ennatosaurus has less with only 10 teeth per half jaw. The anterior teeth of the mandibles of A. romeri are relatively worn. Some of the most posterior teeth are worn and some are not. The cusps disappear quickly with wear and the final stages produce a button-shaped crown whose surface is formed by the bulbous, rounded area of the central part of the tooth. The robustness of these teeth, coupled with the heavy wear they show, indicate that the diet of A. romeri must have included plants that are tougher than those on which most other herbivorous caseids fed.

The postcranial skeleton of A. romeri differs mainly from that of the other two species of the genus in characteristics of the pelvis, femur, and humerus. The humerus, although large and heavy with strongly developed ridges and processes, differs from that of A. dolani by its less massive proportions and the presence of a distinct though relatively short shaft. The pelvis is characterized by a pubis and an ischium forming a large, somewhat saddle-shaped plate with a strongly ossified median symphysis whereas it was cartilaginous in A. dolani. In the holotype, the sacrum has only three vertebrae with three associated sacral ribs. However, the paratype FMNH UR 904 has four sacral ribs indicating the presence of four vertebrae in the sacrum of this specimen. It is likely that four is the normal number of sacral vertebrae in this species, as the sacrum of the holotype is in fact incomplete. In the holotype of A. romeri, the three sacral vertebrae are fused while in A. dolani only the first two are fused. The sacral ribs are blade-shaped and are almost completely separated from each other at the joint with the ilium. At most, a slight fusion is observed between the second and the third sacral rib. The femur is relatively small and strongly ossified. It is characterized by the position of the internal trochanter, which is located approximately halfway between the proximal and distal limits of the intertrochanteric fossa. The fourth trochanter is well developed and rises slightly above the ridge of the adductor. The anterior distal condyle is shallow and flat and is well separated from the posterior condyle. The latter is larger and bears a well-defined surface for articulation with the fibula. The popliteal space is prominent.

== Stratigraphic distribution ==
The age of the San Angelo Formation has been the subject of many interpretations, these assigning it alternatively a late Cisuralian (Kungurian) and/or basal Guadalupian (Roadian) age. The San Angelo Formation overlies the Clear Fork Group and is overlain by the Blaine Formation. According to Spencer G. Lucas and colleagues, fusulins found in a marine intercalation of the San Angelo Formation, as well as ammonoids present at the base of the overlying Blaine Formation, indicated a Kungurian age. Moreover, according to these authors, the base of the San Andres Formation, located further west and considered a lateral equivalent of the Blaine Formation, is in the Neostreptognathodus prayi conodont zone, the second of the three Kungurian conodont biozones. The base of the Blaine Formation would therefore belong to this Kungurian biozone, suggesting that the underlying San Angelo Formation and Angelosaurus would be slightly older than the N. prayi conodont zone with a lower Kungurian age. However, Michel Laurin and Robert W. Hook argued that the fusuline marine intercalation cited above does not belong to the San Angelo Formation in which it was mistakenly included, and cannot be used to date the latter. The name San Angelo Formation has been incorrectly applied to a wide variety of rocks in various sedimentary basins located in western Texas, whereas the San Angelo Formation is restricted to the eastern shelf and is exclusively continental and devoid of marine fossils. On the other hand, the taxonomic revision of the ammonoids from the base of the Blaine Formation indicates a Roadian age rather than a Kungurian age (Note: Taken individually, the seven genera of ammonoids of this fauna have a temporal distribution extending from the Cisuralian to the Lopingian: three are known from the Cisuralian and Guadalupian deposits, two extend from the Cisuralian to the Lopingian, and two are recorded in the Guadalupian to lower Lopingian rocks. However, the Roadian (basal Guadalupian) is the only stage during which the seven genera coexist.) and the San Angelo formation yielded a fossil flora dominated by voltzian conifers, an assemblage rather characteristic of the Guadalupian and the Lopingian. Thus, according to Laurin and Hook, the San Angelo Formation could date from latest Kungurian or earliest Roadian, or more likely could straddle the Kungurian/Roadian boundary.

With a stratigraphic position equivalent to the central part of the Flowerpot Formation, the Chickasha Formation contains the most recent Permian tetrapod fauna of North America, including A. romeri. On the basis of its faunal composition, a Middle Permian (= Guadalupian) age was assigned to it several times. This attribution is based mainly on the presence in the Chickasha fauna of the parareptile Macroleter that was previously known only from the Mezen assemblage in European Russia, which contains a clearly Guadalupian non mammalian therapsids fauna, and also the caseid Ennatosaurus. Another possible clue of a Guadalupian age is the presence in the Chickasha fauna of the largest known representative of the varanopid, Watongia, whose large dimensions would be the sign of a late increase in size in the evolution of this clade, which would have taken the place of top predator in the absence of Sphenacodontidae. However, the presence of the genus Macroleter in both Russia and Oklahoma does not guarantee that the Mezen assemblage and the Chickasha formation are (sub) contemporary because various Permian tetrapods genera had a wide temporal distribution, such Dimetrodon and Diplocaulus. Another example, the varanopid Mesenosaurus, originally known from the Guadalupian assemblage of Mezen, is also represented by a distinct species in a locality from Oklahoma radiometrically dated to the mid-Lower Permian (Artinskian), an age difference of at least 20 million years with the Russian species. Thus, the age of the Chickasha Formation can hardly be estimated from its fauna. Other researchers assign it a Kungurian age. However, magnetostratigraphic data suggest that the Chickasha formation probably dates from the lower Roadian. This age is also consistent with the stratigraphic position of the Chickasha Formation which occupies a slightly higher position than that of the San Angelo Formation dated to the Kungurian-Roadian boundary.

== Paleoenvironments ==
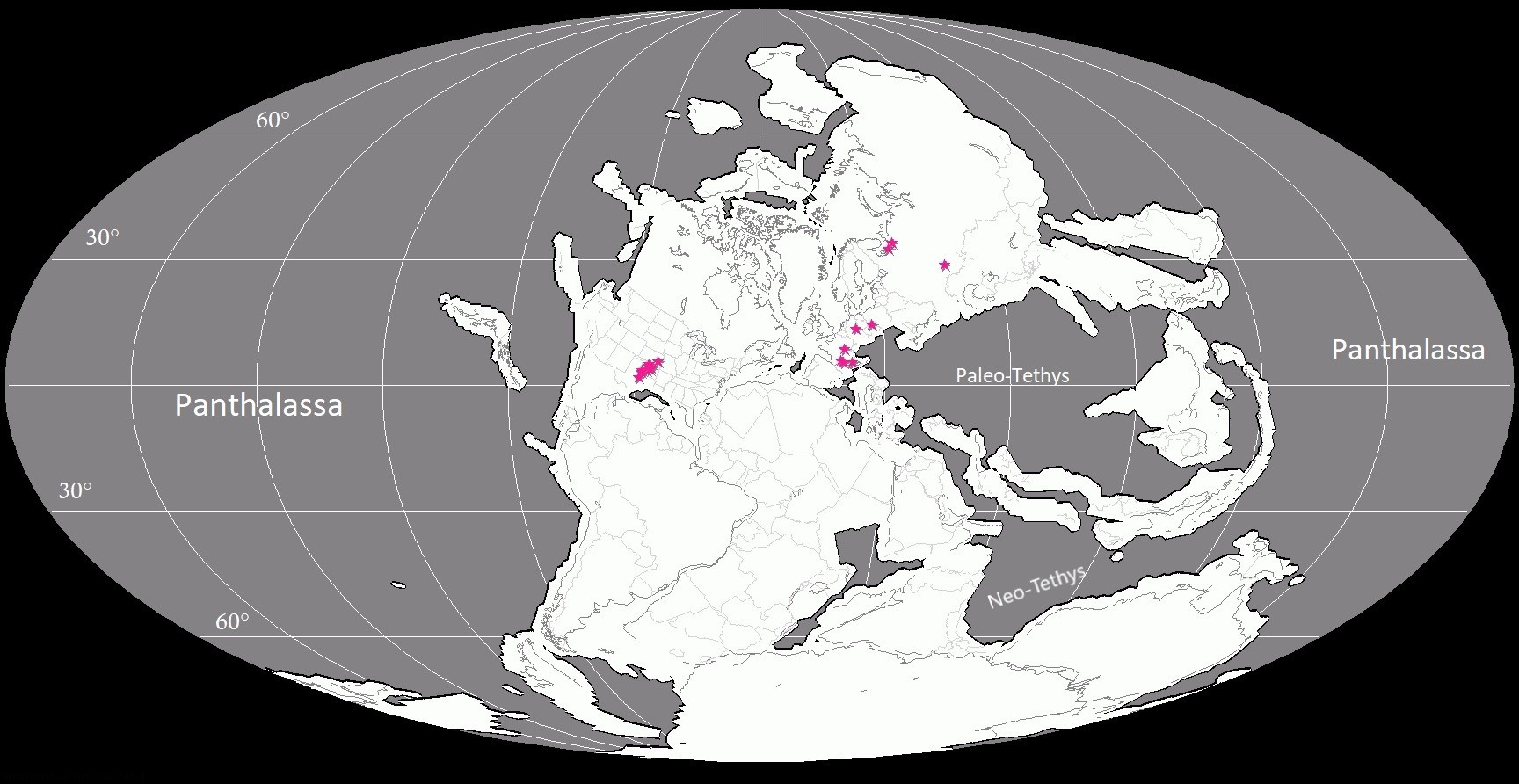
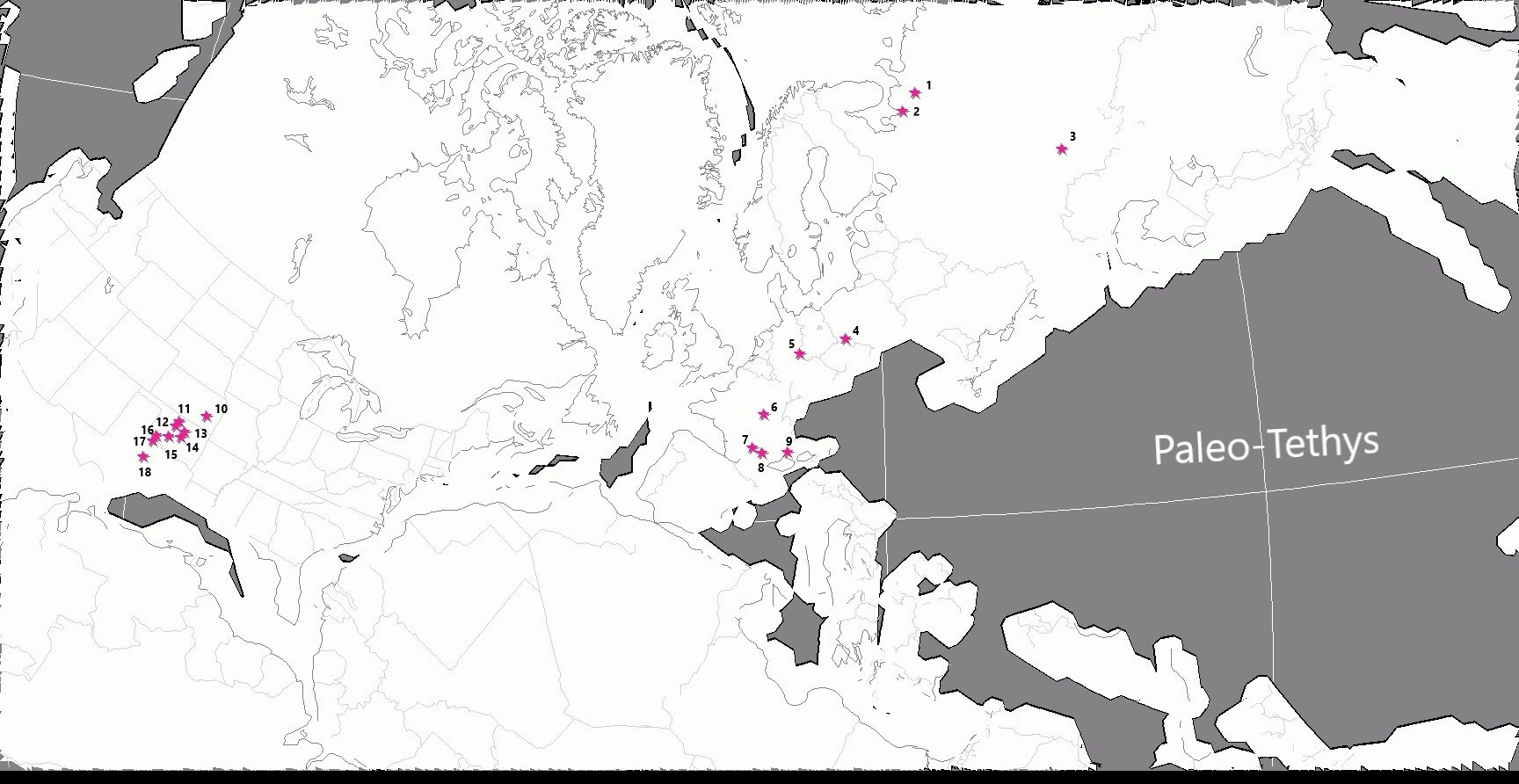
Left: paleogeographic map of Earth at the end of the Paleozoic showing the known distribution of caseid synapsids. Right: close-up of the paleogeographic location of the caseid sites. 1 and 2 Ennatosaurus tecton, Arkhangelsk Oblast, Russia, late Roadian – early Wordian; 3 Phreatophasma aenigmaticum, Bashkortostan, Russia, early Roadian; 4 Datheosaurus macrourus, Lower Silesian Voivodeship, Poland, Gzhelian; 5 Martensius bromackerensis, Thuringia, Germany, Sakmarian; 6 Callibrachion gaudryi, Saône-et-Loire, France, Asselian; 7 Euromycter rutenus and Ruthenosaurus russellorum, Aveyron, France, late Artinskian; 8 Lalieudorhynchus gandi, Hérault, France, Wordian – early Capitanian; 9 Alierasaurus ronchii, Nurra, Sardinia, Italy, Roadian; 10 Eocasea martini, Greenwood County, Kansas, late Pennsylvanian; 11 Angelosaurus romeri and Cotylorhynchus bransoni, Kingfisher County, Oklahoma, early Roadian; 12 Cotylorhynchus bransoni, Blaine County, Oklahoma, early Roadian; 13 Cotylorhynchus romeri, Logan County, Oklahoma, mid-late Kungurian; 14 Cotylorhynchus romeri, Cleveland County, Oklahoma, mid-late Kungurian; 15 Oromycter dolesorum and Arisierpeton simplex, Comanche County, Oklahoma, early Artinskian; 16 Cotylorhynchus hancocki, Hardeman County, Texas, late Kungurian – early Roadian; 17 Cotylorhynchus hancocki, Angelosaurus dolani, A. greeni, Caseoides sanangeloensis, and Caseopsis agilis, Knox County, Texas, late Kungurian – early Roadian; 18 Casea broilii, Baylor County, Texas, mid-late Kungurian.

In the Permian, most of the landmasses was united in a single supercontinent, Pangea. It was then roughly C-shaped: its northern (Laurasia) and southern (Gondwana) parts were connected to the west but separated to the east by the Tethys Ocean. A long string of microcontinents, grouped under the name of Cimmeria, divided the Tethys in two : the Paleo-Tethys in the north, and the Neo-Tethys in the south. The San Angelo and Chickasha formations correspond mainly to fluvial and aeolian sediments deposited in a vast deltaic plain dotted with lakes and lagoons. This coastal plain was bordered to the west by a sea that occupied what is today the Gulf of Mexico and the southernmost part of North America. The rivers ending in the delta came from modest reliefs located further east and corresponding to the ancestral uplifts of the Ouachita, Arbuckle and Wichita mountains. The climate was subtropical with moderate and seasonal rains. There was a summer monsoon as well as a dry winter season. The monsoon was relatively weak, due to the limited size of the sea and the small differential between summer and winter temperatures. The presence of evaporites indicates significant aridity interrupted by seasonal flooding.

The San Angelo Formation is composed at its base of hard, green, gray and brown sandstones and fine conglomerates, all of them unfossiliferous. The central part of the formation consists mainly of red mudstones corresponding to clayey and silty mud deposited on the coastal plains during periodic flooding episodes. The mode of preservation of the type specimen of Angelosaurus dolani, with the posterior part of the skeleton articulated and the anterior part incomplete and dislocated, suggests that the animal was trapped in muddy sediment and then devoured by carnivores who dispersed the exposed parts. The caseid Caseoides is also present in this part of the formation. These red mudstones are interspersed with a thin level of green sandstone, sandy mudstones, and evaporites. These correspond to a minor and ephemeral encroachment of estuaries, lagoons, and very shallow seas on the terrestrial part of the delta. The upper part of the San Angelo Formation is characterized by the preponderance of coarse sediments such as sandstones and conglomerates, but also including at its base sandy mudstones and at its top pure red mudstones. According to Olson, these sediments were deposited by wider and more powerful rivers than those in the central part of the formation. However, in Oklahoma, strata equivalent to the San Angelo Formation, which were also considered fluvio-deltaic and coastal deposits, have been reinterpreted as being of aeolian origin. The base of the upper San Angelo Formation is characterized by the absence of the genus Angelosaurus and the abundance of Cotylorhynchus hanckoki, which is associated, among others, with the caseid Caseopsis agilis, the sphenacodontid Dimetrodon angelensis, and the captorhinids Rothianiscus multidonta, and Kahneria seltina. At the top of the San Angelo Formation, red mudstones are again the dominant sedimentary facies. The genus Angelosaurus is again present (with the species A. greeni), accompanied by Caseoides cf. agilis, R. multidonta and K. seltina.

In Oklahoma, the Chickasha Formation corresponds to the central part of the Flowerpot Formation in which it is locally inserted. The sediments that compose it are varied and include red shales, sandstones, mudstones, conglomerates, and evaporites, deposited in floodplains and channels bordering the sea and coastal lagoons. In the Omega quarry, all the fossils come from sandstones, mudstones and hard, siliceous conglomerates, arranged in lenses. They correspond to deposits of an old channel about 1.50 m thick and 4.6 m wide where the skeletons of Angelosaurus romeri have accumulated, but also those of a second caseid, Cotylorhynchus bransoni, and those of the captorhinid Rothianiscus robustus. Elsewhere in this formation are known the Xenacanthiform Orthacanthus, the Nectridea Diplocaulus, the temnospondyle Dissorophidae Nooxobeia, the pareiasauromorpha Nycteroleteridae Macroleter, and the Varanopidae Varanodon and Watongia.

== Phylogeny ==
All phylogenetics studies of caseids consider Angelosaurus to be a taxon close to the genera Ennatosaurus and Cotylorhynchus. In the first phylogenetic analysis of caseids published in 2008, the species Angelosaurus dolani is recovered as the sister group of Cotylorhynchus romeri.

Below is the first caseid cladogram published by Maddin et al. in 2008.

- Caseasauria
  - Eothyris
  - Caseidae
    - Oromycter dolesorum
    - - Casea broilii
      - - Casea rutena
        - - Ennatosaurus tecton
          - - Cotylorhynchus romeri
            - Angelosaurus dolani

Another phylogenetic analysis performed in 2012 by Benson identifies Angelosaurus romeri as the sister group of the three species of Cotylorhynchus.

Below is the caseasaurs cladogram released by Benson in 2012.

- Caseasauria
  - Eothyrididae
    - Eothyris parkeyi
    - Oedaleops campi
  - Caseidae
    - Oromycter dolesorum
    - - Casea broilii
      - - Trichasaurus texensis
        - - “Casea” rutena
          - - Ennatosaurus tecton
            - - Angelosaurus romeri
              - - Cotylorhynchus romeri
                - - Cotylorhynchus hancocki
                  - Cotylorhynchus bransoni

In 2015, Romano and Nicosia published the first cladistic study including almost all caseids, except for very fragmentary taxa such as Alierasaurus ronchii and Angelosaurus greeni. In this analysis, Angelosaurus and Ennatosaurus form a clade and this clade is the sister group of a clade containing the genus Ruthenosaurus and the three species of Cotylorhynchus.

Below is the caseid cladogram published by Romano and Nicosia in 2015.

- Caseasauria
  - Eothyris parkeyi
  - Caseidae
    - Oromycter dolesorum
    - - Casea broilii
      - - Euromycter rutenus
        - - - Caseoides sanangeloensis
            - - “Casea” nicholsi
              - Caseopsis agilis
          - - - Cotylorhynchus bransoni
              - - Cotylorhynchus romeri
                - - Cotylorhynchus hancocki
                  - Ruthenosaurus russellorum
            - - Angelosaurus romeri
              - - Angelosaurus dolani
                - Ennatosaurus tecton

In 2020, two cladograms published by Berman and colleagues also recover Angelosaurus as one of the most derived caseids. In the first cladogram, Angelosaurus romeri together with the three species of Cotylorhynchus and Alierasaurus form an unresolved polytomy. In the second cladogram, A. romeri is the sister taxon of a clade containing Cotylorhynchus and Alierasaurus.

Below are the two caseids cladograms published by Berman and colleagues in 2020.

- Caseidae
  - Eocasea martini
  - - - Martensius bromackerensis
      - - Casea broilii
        - Oromycter dolesorum
        - Trichasaurus texensis
        - Casea nicholsi
        - Euromycter rutenus
        - - Ennatosaurus tecton
          - - Angelosaurus romeri
            - Alierasaurus ronchii
            - Cotylorhynchus romeri
            - Cotylorhynchus bransoni
            - Cotylorhynchus hancocki

- Caseidae
  - Eocasea martini
  - - - Martensius bromackerensis
      - - Casea broilii
        - - Oromycter dolesorum
          - Trichasaurus texensis
          - - Casea nicholsi
            - - Euromycter rutenus
              - - Ennatosaurus tecton
                - - Angelosaurus romeri
                  - - Alierasaurus ronchii
                    - Cotylorhynchus romeri
                    - - Cotylorhynchus bransoni
                      - Cotylorhynchus hancocki

A phylogenetic analysis published in 2022 by Werneburg and colleagues suggests that the genera Angelosaurus and Cotylorhynchus may be paraphyletic, the taxa other than their type species possibly belonging to different genera.

Below is the cladogram published by Werneburg and colleagues in 2022.

- Caseidae
  - Martensius bromackerensis
  - - - Oromycter dolesorum
      - - Casea
        - - “Casea” nicholsi
          - - Euromycter
            - - Ennatosaurus
              - - Angelosaurus dolani
                - “Angelosaurus” romeri
                - - - Ruthenosaurus
                    - Caseopsis
                  - Cotylorhynchus romeri
                  - - Alierasaurus
                    - - “Cotylorhynchus” bransoni
                      - - Lalieudorhynchus
                        - “Cotylorhynchus” hancocki

== See also ==
- List of pelycosaurs
