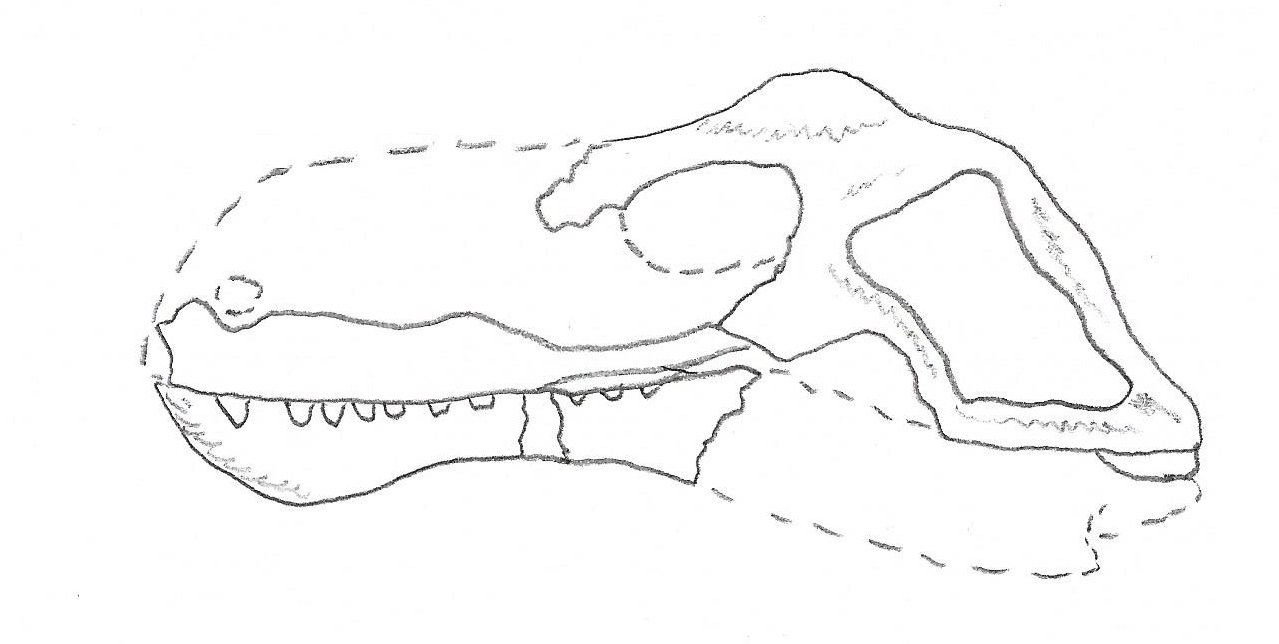
- Illustration showing known material and reconstructed outline of the skull

Scientific classification
- Kingdom: Animalia
- Phylum: Chordata
- Clade: Synapsida
- Clade: incertae sedis
- Family: †Dimacrodontidae; Olson & Beerbower, 1953
- Genus: †Dimacrodon; Olson & Beerbower, 1953
- Species: †D. hottoni

Binomial name
- †Dimacrodon hottoni Olson & Beerbower, 1953

= Dimacrodon =

Dimacrodon Temporal range: Early Permian Kungurian stage?

Extinct genus of synapsids

Dimacrodon is an extinct genus of non-mammalian synapsid from the latest Early Permian San Angelo Formation of Texas. It is distinguished by toothless, possibly beaked jaw tips, large lower canines and a thin bony crest on top of its head. Previously thought to be an anomodont therapsid related to dicynodonts, it was later found to lack any diagnostic features of anomodonts or even therapsids and instead appears to be a 'pelycosaur'-grade synapsid of uncertain classification.

== Description ==
Three specimens of D. hottoni are known, although they only comprise incomplete portions of the lower jaw and skull. The holotype specimen consists of a single partial mandible with teeth. The jaw is long with an unusually broad and deep mandibular symphysis, while the jaw rami are slender (although the additional material from D. sp. below suggests that the back of the jaws was also deeper). Unusually, the front of the jaw is toothless and has a rough bone texture, possibly supporting a beak like in dicynodonts, with no pre-canine teeth. Behind the toothless region is a single pair of large caniniforms, while the teeth behind them are much smaller and uniform in size, unlike typical 'pelycosaur' dentition (although see the edaphosaurid Gordodon), and are thecodont like the teeth of therapsids.

An additional specimen referred to Dimacrodon sp. includes more extensive, but still incomplete material from the rear of skull and margins of the upper jaw. The back of the skull is deep and broad, with a large temporal fenestra that is roughly trapezoid in shape and slopes down and back from the roof of the skull. There is a small, thin parietal crest of bone in the middle of the skull between the eyes and temporal fenestra. What is known of the premaxilla suggests that it had a broad, flattened plate that opposed the beak-like lower jaw and likewise was also toothless. A jaw fragment containing two large "canines" are also known from this specimen, although it is unknown if it is from the lower or upper jaw. This skull is believed to be the largest-known specimen of Dimacrodon, and was estimated by Olson (1962) to be approximately 50 centimetres (20 in) in length when restored.

== Classification ==
Olson and Beerbower tentatively assigned Dimacrodon to Therapsida in 1953 (along with other unusual synapsids from the San Angelo Formation) due to its therapsid-like teeth and general resemblance to various therapsids. The jaw structure was similar to the dinocephalian Titanophoneus, the toothless beak-like jaw tips similar to dicynodonts, and they also noted general similarities to gorgonopsians as well. However, it could not be attributed to any one of these groups, and so they did not classify it beyond being a probable therapsid. They suggested that it represented a synapsid that had independently reached the therapsid "level of organisation" from the better-known Russian and South African therapsids, reflecting the pre-cladistics method of classification employed at the time. Olson later provided a more definitive classification in 1962 when he assigned it to Anomodontia, specifically to the infraorder Venyukovioidea, and erected its own monogeneric family, the Dimacrodontidae.

Olson also described an additional specimen in 1962 which he attributed to a possible second species as D. sp., based on possible presence of two caniniform teeth in the tooth row, as well as variations in the spacing and shape of the postcanine teeth and the overall size difference. D. hittoni was characterised as having only a single lower "canine" tooth in each jaw; however, the number of upper "canines" is unknown. Two lower "canines" could distinguish D. sp. from D. hittoni, although it is possible that D. hittoni had two upper "canines" and the jaw fragment is simply from the upper jaw of D. hittoni. It is unclear then if D. sp. truly represents a distinct species or if it is simply a large specimen of D. hittoni.

Dimacrodon was mistakenly assigned to Anomodontia primarily because of its broad, toothless mandibular symphysis, which resembled the beaks of dicynodonts. Olson also interpreted the deep jaw tips and cheek teeth as resembling those of the Russian anomodont Venyukovia, leading him to group them together in the infraorder Venyukovioidea (although unlike Dimacrodon, venyukoviids possess front teeth). It was also briefly regarded as a dinocephalian in Tapinocephalia by Robert L. Carroll in 1988, but this was never elaborated upon. In 1995, Sidor and Hopson revisited the San Angelo therapsids and reported that all of them were likely to be based on 'pelycosaur' material and that none of them were therapsids, including Dimacrodon. This re-identification has been accepted and followed since then; however, features of its skull such as the differentiated teeth and large temporal fenestra have been described as therapsid-like. No further studies on Dimacrodon have been carried out since then, and it remains unclear what its true phylogenetic relationships are amongst early-derived therapsids.

== Palaeoecology ==
In the upper San Angelo Formation, Dimacrodon co-existed with and was found alongside the abundant giant herbivorous caseid Cotylorhynchus, along with the captorhinid Rothianiscus and similarly enigmatic synapsid Tappenosaurus. The upper San Angelo Formation has been interpreted as a near-shore terrestrial environment, cut by numerous channels and experiencing periods of flooding, during which the bones of Dimacrodon were likely deposited. Olson and Beerbower regarded Dimacrodon as a carnivore, although the beak-like jaws were noted as being more similar to the herbivorous dicynodonts.

== See also ==
- List of pelycosaurs
