= Flowerpot Formation =

Geologic formation in Texas and Oklahoma, United States

- Stratigraphic range: Early Permian, Cisuralian 279.3 –268.8 Ma
- Type: Formation
- Unit of: Pease River Group
- Underlies: Blaine Formation
- Overlies: Duncan Formation

Lithology
- Primary: Shale
- Other: Gypsum, Conglomerate

Location
- Region: Texas, Oklahoma
- Country: United States

Flowerpot Formation (also referred to as the Flower Pot Formation) is a geologic formation in Texas and Oklahoma preserving fossils dated to the Early Permian.

== Description ==
The Flowerpot formation is very similar in geology to and was once thought to overlie the San Angelo formation, sometimes only being able to be differentiated by what layer underlie the unit in the area of study, both being mostly made up of red shales. Though unlike San Angelo, the depositional environment of the terrestrial shales of the Flowerpot formation seemed to be immediately adjacent along with the formation of deltas and floodplains being present. Due to this, stream deposits from the formation can directly be traces to the nearby basin. The formation lacks plant fossils, however there are records of carbonaceous streaks.

== Paleobiota ==
=== Actinopterygii ===
Genus	Species	Notes	Image
Palaeoniscidae?		There is not much fish material preserved in the formation it is unknown if this is due to the preservation bias or the fact that not many fish lived in the area.	

=== Amphibia ===
Genus	Species	Notes	Image
Cymatorhiza	C. kittsi	A large microsaur known from a part of the mandible with tooth rooting similar to what is seen in other genera such as Euryodus.	

=== Eureptilia ===
Genus	Species	Notes	Image
Kahneria	K. seltina	A large captorhinid common in the Flower Pot formation, the animal's dentition contained a diastema at the pterygoid. It was overall similar to other captorhinids such as Captorhinus.	
Rothianiscus	R. multidonta	A large captorhinid originally described as the genus Rothia, it had a skull length of around 26 cm. Based on the dentition, it would have been either herbivorous or omnivorous.	

=== Synapsida ===
Genus	Species	Notes	Image
Angelosaurus	A. dolani	A caseid that lacks the development of the large proximal end of the tibia seen in other members of the family. A. romeri has shorter and wider crowns than what is seen in the other two species.	
Angelosaurus	A. greeni	A caseid that lacks the development of the large proximal end of the tibia seen in other members of the family. A. romeri has shorter and wider crowns than what is seen in the other two species.	
Angelosaurus	A. romeri	A caseid that lacks the development of the large proximal end of the tibia seen in other members of the family. A. romeri has shorter and wider crowns than what is seen in the other two species.	
Caseopsis	C. agilis	A medium-sized caseid with a light build and long limbs, though the articular surfaces on the limb bones are small for the size of the animal.	
Caseopsis	C. cf. agilis	A caseid very similar to C. agilis though due to poor preservation it can't be confidentially attributed to the species. It also has a slightly more robust tibia than what is seen in other specimens of C. agilis.	
Cotylorhynchus	C. bransoni	A large caseid though the smallest species within the genus.	
Steppesaurus	S. gurleyi	A potential sphenacodontid that was originally though to be from the San Angelo formation before some geological revisions. The animal shows a large reduction in its dentition on the maxilla and premaxilla along with a slightly longer face than what is seen in Dimetrodon.	

=== Plants ===
Genus	Species	Notes	Image
Sphenophyllum	S. gilmorei		
