= Eosyodon =

Eosyodon Temporal range: Kungurian

Scientific classification
- Domain: Eukaryota
- Kingdom: Animalia
- Phylum: Chordata
- Clade: Synapsida
- Family: †Sphenacodontidae
- Genus: †Eosyodon; Olson, 1962
- Species: †E. hudsoni

Binomial name
- †Eosyodon hudsoni Olson, 1962

Extinct genus of synapsids

Eosyodon is a dubious genus of extinct non-mammalian synapsids from the Permian of Texas. Its type and only species is Eosyodon hudsoni. Though it was originally interpreted as an early therapsid, it is probably a member of Sphenacodontidae, the family of synapsids that includes Dimetrodon.

Eosyodon hudsoni was named by Everett C. Olson in 1962 on the basis of fragmentary material from the San Angelo Formation in Texas. The species name honors J. Hudson, a ranch foreman who aided Olson's work. A femur, currently cataloged as FMNH UR 575, was designated the holotype, and skull fragments, partial ribs, and a few other bones were also assigned to the species. Olson interpreted Eosyodon as a therapsid closely related to Syodon, and assigned both genera to the family Brithopodidae of the infraorder Eotheriodontia. Eotheriodonta was a new taxon defined by Olson in the same paper, to encompass several taxa he regarded as a group of therapsids intermediate between pelycosaurs and later therapsids.

In 1995, C. A. Sidor and J. A. Hopson presented a reevaluation of Olson's eotheriodonts at the annual conference of the Society of Vertebrate Paleontology, and concluded that they were based on caseid and sphenacodontid pelycosaurs. In 2011, Christian Kammerer agreed with their evaluation and concluded that Eosyodon was a sphenacodontid. He regarded Eosyodon as a nomen dubium.

Olson regarded the San Angelo fauna, including Eosyodon, as being from the early Guadalupian, chronologically equivalent to the Kazanian therapsid fauna of Russia. However, the San Angelo Formation is now regarded as belonging to the Kungurian stage of the Permian. As such, Eosyodon is somewhat older than the earliest definitive therapsids.

== See also ==
- List of pelycosaurs

== Bibliography ==
- DiMichele, William A.; Mamay, Sergius H.; Chaney, Dan S.; Hook, Robert W.; Nelson, W. John (2001). "An Early Permian flora with Late Permian and Mesozoic affinities from North-Central Texas". Journal of Paleontology. 75 (2): 12.
- Kammerer, Christian F. (2011). "Systematics of the Anteosauria (Therapsida: Dinocephalia)". Journal of Systematic Palaeontology. 9 (2): 261–304. doi:10.1080/14772019.2010.492645. ISSN 1477-2019.
- Lucas, Spencer G; Golubev, Valeriy K (2019). "Age and duration of Olson's Gap, a global hiatus in the Permian tetrapod fossil record". Permophiles. 67: 20–23. ISSN 1684-5927.
- Olson, Everett C. (1962). "Late Permian Terrestrial Vertebrates, U. S. A. and U. S. S. R.". Transactions of the American Philosophical Society. 52 (2): 1–224. doi:10.2307/1005904. ISSN 0065-9746. JSTOR 1005904.
- Sidor, C. A.; Hopson, J. A. (1995). "The taxonomic status of the Upper Permian eotheriodont therapsids of the San Angelo Formation (Guadalupian), Texas". Journal of Vertebrate Paleontology. 15 (3A): 53A.
