= Knoxosaurus =

Knoxosaurus Temporal range: Middle Permian, 270 Ma

Scientific classification
- Domain: Eukaryota
- Kingdom: Animalia
- Phylum: Chordata
- Clade: Synapsida
- Clade: incertae sedis
- Genus: †Knoxosaurus; Olson, 1962

Type species
- †Knoxosaurus niteckii Olson, 1962

Extinct genus of synapsids

Knoxosaurus is an extinct genus of non-mammalian synapsids containing the species Knoxosaurus niteckii that existed approximately 279.5 to 268 million years ago. It was named by American paleontologist Everett C. Olson in 1962 on the basis of fragmentary fossils from Middle Permian-age deposits in the San Angelo Formation of Texas in the United States. Olson placed Knoxosaurus in a new infraorder called Eotheriodontia, which he considered a transitional group between the more reptile-like "pelycosaurs" and the more mammal-like therapsids. Knoxosaurus and Olson's other eotheriodonts were later considered to be undiagnostic remains of basal synapsids, no more closely related to therapsids than are other pelycosaur-grade synapsids.

== See also ==
- List of therapsids
