= Gorgodon =

Gorgodon Temporal range: Early Permian

Scientific classification
- Kingdom: Animalia
- Phylum: Chordata
- Clade: Synapsida
- Clade: incertae sedis
- Genus: †Gorgodon; Olson, 1962

Type species
- †Gorgodon minutus Olson, 1962

Extinct genus of synapsids

Gorgodon is an extinct genus of basal synapsids. The genus is monotypic, known only from the type species Gorgodon minutus from the Early Permian of the southwestern United States. The only known remains of Gorgodon are two fossils consisting of fragments of the skull. Gorgodon was described and named by paleontologist Everett C. Olson in 1962 from the San Angelo Formation in Knox County, Texas. Based on what is known of Gorgodon—the squamosal, quadrate, and pterygoid bones of the back of the skull, the maxilla and premaxilla bones that make up the front of the skull, and several teeth—Gorgodon had a relatively large temporal fenestra and a pair large, conical caniniform teeth at the front of the jaw. Other distinguishing features of Gorgodon include the fused connection between the quadrate and squamosal bones and a long transverse process of the pterygoid (a projection extending from the pterygoid bone on the underside of the skull).

Olson classified Gorgodon as a very early therapsid because it had a heterodont dentition and large temporal fenestra not seen in the most basal synapsids but present in therapsids. He placed it in the family Phthinosuchidae because its teeth seemed similar to those of Phthinosaurus, an enigmatic therapsid from the Middle Permian of Russia that is most likely a dinocephalian. However, the only known teeth of Phthinosaurus are from its lower jaw and the known teeth of Gorgodon are from its upper jaw. Olson reasoned that the shape of the teeth of Gorgodon match what would be expected for the upper teeth of Phthinosaurus even though there are no homologous features between the two taxa that would support such a relationship. Olson thought that Gorgodon was more primitive than Phthinosaurus, and that both were ancestors of a group of therapsids called gorgonopsids.

Sidor and Hopson (1995) proposed that Gorgodon and several other early therapsids that Olson described from the San Angelo Formation were instead the crushed remains of sphenacodontids. Sphenacodontids are a group of non-therapsid synapsids that were common in what is now the southwestern United States during the Early Permian. Although Gorgodon is most likely a non-therapsid synapsid, its relationship to other synapsids has not been assessed due to its lack of distinguishing anatomical features.
