= San Angelo Formation =

Geologic formation in Texas, United States

- Stratigraphic range: Kungurian
- Type: Formation
- Unit of: Pease River Group
- Underlies: Blaine Formation
- Overlies: Clear Fork Group

Location
- Region: Texas
- Country: United States

The San Angelo Formation is a geologic formation in Texas. It preserves fossils dating back to the Permian period. Along with the Chickasha Formation is one of the two geologically youngest formations in North America to preserve fossils of caseids, and it is the youngest one to preserve remains of undoubted sphenacodontids, namely, Dimetrodon angelensis.

== Stratigraphy and age ==
Some studies argued that the San Angelo Formation belongs to the Kungurian stage of the Cisuralian series because it underlies the Blaine Formation, which is, according to the same studies, either upper Kungurian or lower Guadalupian. However, a recent study concluded that Olson was correct in regarding the San Angelo Formation as belonging to the Roadian, and that the Blaine Formation also dates from the Roadian.

== Fossil content ==
Everett C. Olson regarded the San Angelo Formation as preserving some of the oldest known therapsids, several of which he classified in a taxon he called Eotheriodonta. These taxa are now interpreted as caseids and sphenacodontids, not therapsids.

Color key: Taxon / Reclassified taxon / Taxon falsely reported as present / Dubious taxon or junior synonym / Ichnotaxon / Ootaxon / Morphotaxon	Notes; Uncertain or tentative taxa are in small text; ~~crossed out~~ taxa are discredited.

=== Synapsids ===
Genus	Species	Location	Material	Notes	Images
Angelosaurus	A. dolani			A caseid	
Caseoides	C. sanangeloensis			A caseid	
Caseopsis	C. agilis			A caseid	
Cotylorhynchus	C. hancocki			A caseid	
Dimacrodon	D. hottoni				
Dimetrodon	D. angelensis			A sphenacodontid	
Driveria	D. ponderosa				
Eosyodon	E. hudsoni			A dubious sphenacodontid	
Gorgodon	G. minutus				
Knoxosaurus	K. niteckii				
Mastersonia	M. driverensis				
Tappenosaurus	T. magnus			A possible sphenacodontid	

== See also ==
- List of fossiliferous stratigraphic units in Texas
- Paleontology in Texas

== Bibliography ==
- DiMichele, William A.; Mamay, Sergius H.; Chaney, Dan S.; Hook, Robert W.; Nelson, W. John (2001). "An Early Permian flora with Late Permian and Mesozoic affinities from North-Central Texas". Journal of Paleontology. 75 (2): 12.
- Kammerer, Christian F. (2011). "Systematics of the Anteosauria (Therapsida: Dinocephalia)". Journal of Systematic Palaeontology. 9 (2): 261–304. doi:10.1080/14772019.2010.492645. ISSN 1477-2019.
- Lucas, Spencer G; Golubev, Valeriy K (2019). "Age and duration of Olson's Gap, a global hiatus in the Permian tetrapod fossil record". Permophiles: 5.
- Olson, Everett C. (1962). "Late Permian Terrestrial Vertebrates, U. S. A. and U. S. S. R.". Transactions of the American Philosophical Society. 52 (2): 1–224. doi:10.2307/1005904. ISSN 0065-9746. JSTOR 1005904.
- Olson, Everett C.; Beerbower, James R. (1953). "The San Angelo Formation, Permian of Texas, and Its Vertebrates". The Journal of Geology. 61 (5): 389–423. doi:10.1086/626109. ISSN 0022-1376. JSTOR 30079693.
- Sidor, C. A.; Hopson, J. A. (1995). "The taxonomic status of the Upper Permian eotheriodont therapsids of the San Angelo Formation (Guadalupian), Texas". Journal of Vertebrate Paleontology. 15 (3A): 53A.
