= Mastersonia =

Mastersonia Temporal range: 279.5–268 Ma

Scientific classification
- Kingdom: Animalia
- Phylum: Chordata
- Clade: Synapsida
- Clade: Therapsida
- Suborder: †Dinocephalia
- Genus: †Mastersonia; Olson, 1962
- Species: †M. driverensis

Binomial name
- †Mastersonia driverensis Olson, 1962

Extinct genus of therapsids

Mastersonia is an extinct genus of non-mammalian therapsids from the Lower Permian of San Angelo Formation, Texas. It is only known from a few, very large vertebrae.

== See also ==
- List of therapsids
