= Oromycter =

Oromycter Temporal range: Early Permian 290.1–268 Ma

Scientific classification
- Kingdom: Animalia
- Phylum: Chordata
- Clade: Synapsida
- Clade: †Caseasauria
- Family: †Caseidae
- Genus: †Oromycter; Reisz, 2005

Type species
- Oromycter dolesorum Reisz, 2005

Extinct genus of synapsids

Oromycter is an extinct genus of caseid synapsids from the Early Permian of Oklahoma. The sole and type species, Oromycter dolesorum, was named in 2005 by Robert R. Reisz.

== Description ==
Oromycter was a small caseid characterized by its dentition, which lacked the distinct leaf-like serrations of other caseids and instead possessed broad, spatulate and roughened cutting edges. Its teeth were also more thoroughly attached to the bone of the skull and jaw than in other members of Caseidae. The first and second teeth of the premaxilla show distinct wear facets which suggest that they occluded with the first and second teeth of the dentary, possibly to facilitate the cropping of vegetation. Its lacrimal bone, while clearly caseid in form, appears more primitive than in any other known caseid.

== Classification ==
Oromycter is the oldest and most basal caseid known, and is the sister taxon of all other caseids.

Below is a cladogram based on the phylogenetic analysis of Maddin et al. in 2008.

- Caseidae
  - Oromycter dolesorum
  - - Casea broilii
    - - "Casea rutena" (now Euromycter rutenus)
      - - Ennatosaurus tecton
        - - Cotylorhynchus romeri
          - Angelosaurus dolani

== See also ==
- List of pelycosaurs
