= Tappenosaurus =

Tappenosaurus Temporal range: Middle Permian

Scientific classification
- Kingdom: Animalia
- Phylum: Chordata
- Clade: Synapsida
- Family: †Sphenacodontidae (?)
- Genus: †Tappenosaurus; Olson and Beerbower, 1953

Type species
- †Tappenosaurus magnus Olson and Beerbower, 1953

Extinct genus of synapsids

Tappenosaurus ("Tappen's lizard") is an extinct genus of synapsids from the Middle Permian of Texas. American paleontologists Everett C. Olson and James Beerbower described the genus in 1953 based on three specimens that were uncovered from the San Angelo Formation. It was named for Neil Tappen, who found the type specimen in 1951 as a member of the field party.

== Description ==
The first specimen (the holotype) is a fragmentary skeleton including parts of the back of the skull, pieces of teeth and ribs, an axis vertebra, a dorsal vertebra, three neural spines, the ends of both humeri and a partial hip. The second specimen includes cervical vertebrae, a rib, and a scapulocoracoid. The third specimen is only represented by ribs. These bones are larger than comparable parts of the largest skeletons of Dimetrodon, a related and much better-known sail-backed synapsid. Olson and Beerbower designated the type species Tappenosaurus magnus in reference to its large size, and also placed it in its own family, Tappenosauridae. Olson later estimated the total length of Tappenosaurus to be 18 feet (5.5 m), comparing it in size with the largest of the dinocephalians, a more advanced group of synapsids that lived later in the Permian.
