= Driveria =

Driveria Temporal range: 279.5–268 Ma

Scientific classification
- Domain: Eukaryota
- Kingdom: Animalia
- Phylum: Chordata
- Clade: Synapsida
- Clade: Therapsida
- Suborder: †Dinocephalia
- Genus: †Driveria; Olson, 1962
- Species: †D. ponderosa

Binomial name
- †Driveria ponderosa Olson, 1962

Extinct genus of therapsids

Driveria is an extinct genus of non-mammalian synapsids the Lower Permian of San Angelo Formation, Texas. It is mostly known from several postcranial bones, including the scapula, pelvis, and a few vertebrae and ribs, although a fragment of the skull that might pertain to the upper temporal fenestra is also associated with this species.

== See also ==
- List of therapsids
