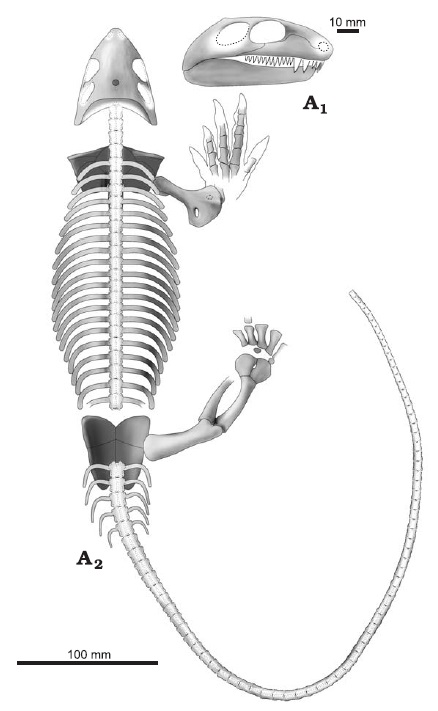
- Skeleton

Scientific classification
- Kingdom: Animalia
- Phylum: Chordata
- Clade: Synapsida
- Clade: †Caseasauria
- Family: †Caseidae
- Genus: †Datheosaurus; Schroeder, 1905
- Species: †D. macrourus

Binomial name
- †Datheosaurus macrourus Schroeder, 1905

= Datheosaurus =

Datheosaurus Temporal range: Late Carboniferous - Early Permian, 299–296.4 Ma

Extinct genus of synapsids

Datheosaurus ("Dathe's lizard") is an extinct genus of caseasaur. It was at least 1.5 metres (5 ft) in length. It lived during the Latest Carboniferous to Early Permian in Poland. It was named for Ernst Dathe (1845–1917), the German geologist who first announced the fossil find.

== Discovery and history ==
It was originally described in 1905 on a basis of a specimen from late Carboniferous deposits in Poland. It was later considered a synonym of Haptodus by several authors, but subsequent examination has found it be a caseid rather a sphenacodont. This was confirmed by cladistic analysis, which recovered Datheosaurus as a basal caseid

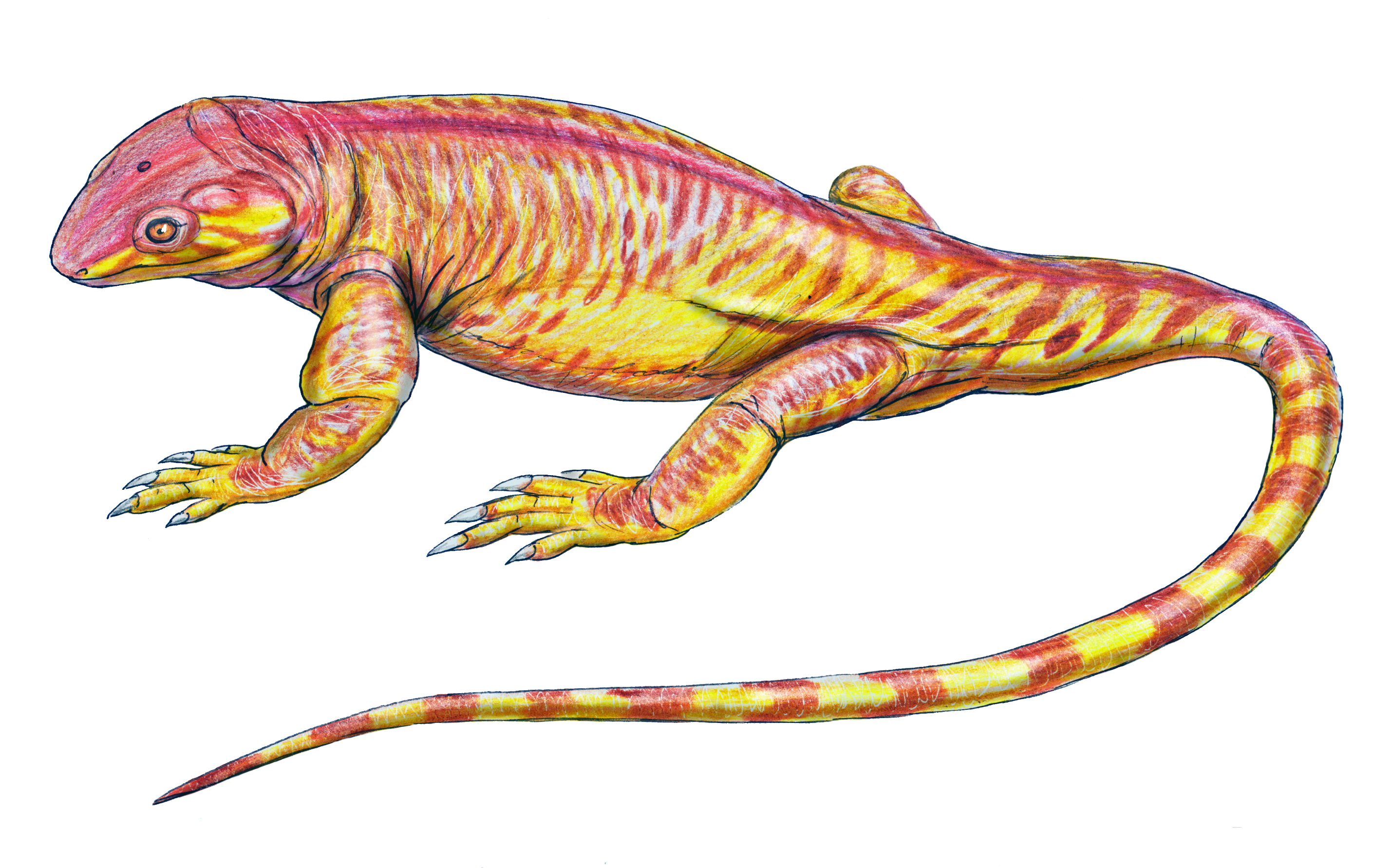
Restoration
