= Scapulocoracoid =

Part of the shoulder girdle

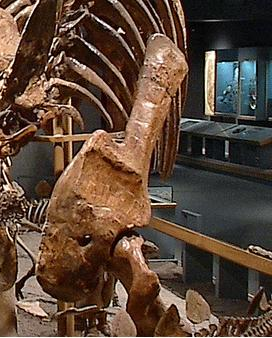
left Stegosaurus stenops Scapulocoracoid

The scapulocoracoid is the unit of the pectoral girdle that contains the coracoid and scapula.

The coracoid itself is a beak-shaped bone that is commonly found in most vertebrates with a few exceptions.

The scapula is commonly known as the shoulder blade. The humerus is linked to the body via the scapula, and the clavicle is connected to the sternum via the scapula as well.

Therian mammals lack a scapulocoracoid.
