= Everett C. Olson =

American paleontologist, zoologist, and geologist

Everett Claire Olson (November 6, 1910 – November 27, 1993) was an American zoologist, paleontologist, and geologist noted for his seminal research of origin and evolution of vertebrate animals. Through his research studying terrestrial vertebrate fossils he identified intervals of extinction in the Permian and Triassic. He developed the concept of chronofauna, which he defined as "a geographically restricted, natural assemblage of interacting animal populations that has maintained its basic structure over a geologically significant period of time". He also proposed stratigraphic correlations between North American (especially the Chickasha and San Angelo Formations) and Russian vertebrate-bearing strata for which additional support was found much later. The drop in terrestrial vertebrate diversity he proposed in at the end of the Kungurian stage of the Permian period that occurred 270 million years ago now carries his name - Olson's Extinction. Alternatively, some scientists think that the change was gradual but that it looks abrupt because of a gap in the fossil record, called "Olson's Gap". Some of his other notable research also included the taxa Slaugenhopia, Trimerorhachis, and Waggoneria.

He received the Quantrell Award.

Olson was a former chair of the department of Biology at the UCLA, a member of the National Academy of Sciences, a recipient of Paleontological Medal of the Paleontological Society (1987), the first recipient of the Romer-Simpson Medal of the Society of Vertebrate Paleontology, a CSEOL Distinguished Scientist (1991). University of California said that Olson "was an internationally recognized pioneer in studies of the origin and evolution of vertebrate animals". The University of Chicago said that he "carried out pioneering research on the evolution of terrestrial ecosystems". The National Academy of Sciences said that he ranked "among the great vertebrate paleontologists of the twentieth century".

== Life and career ==
Olson was born in Waupaca, Wisconsin and grew up in Hinsdale, Illinois. Olson received his undergraduate and graduate degrees, including Ph.D. in geology (1935) from the University of Chicago.
