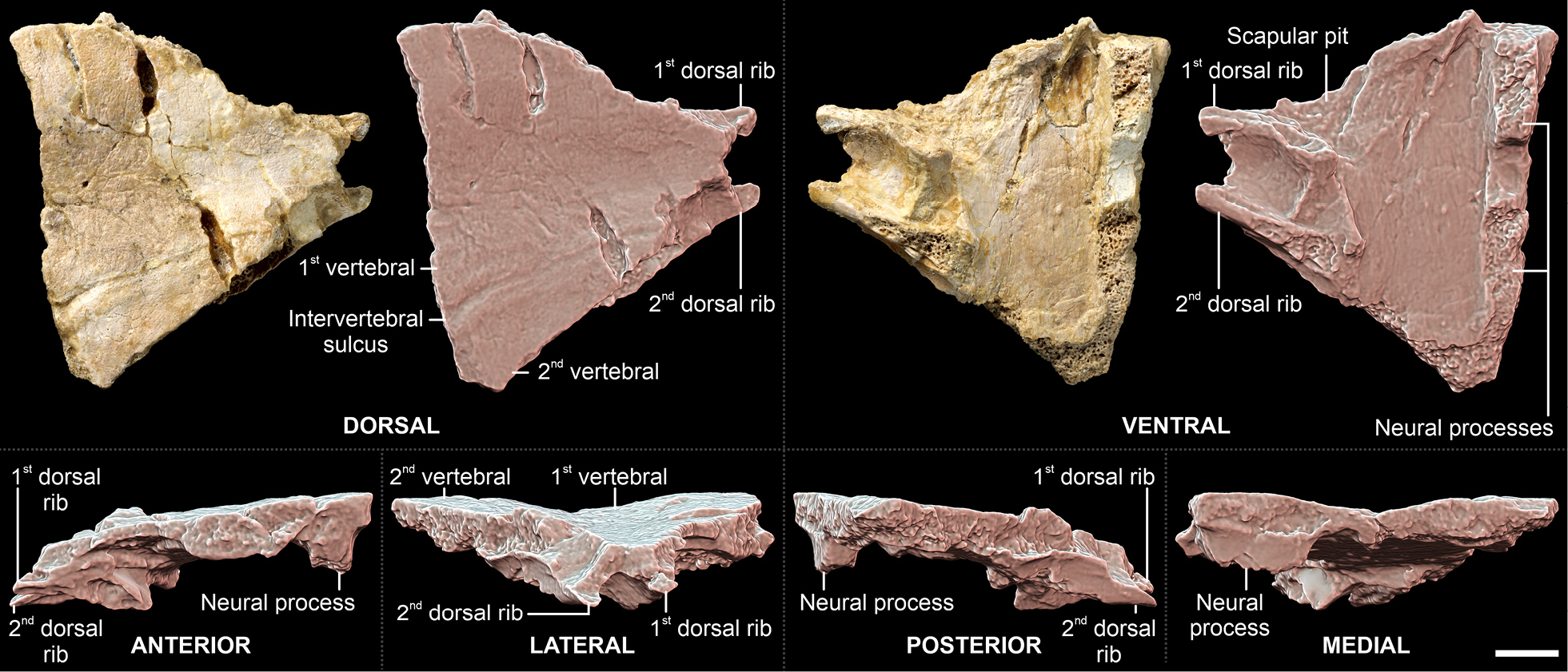
- Carapace fragment (UM-PDE2-03) of the B. lopezi holotype

Scientific classification
- Kingdom: Animalia
- Phylum: Chordata
- Class: Reptilia
- Clade: Pantestudines
- Clade: Testudinata
- Family: †Proterochersidae
- Genus: †Bartassochersis; Szczygielski et al., 2026
- Species: †B. lopezi

Binomial name
- †Bartassochersis lopezi Szczygielski et al., 2026

= Bartassochersis =

Bartassochersis Temporal range: Late Triassic, Rhaetian

Extinct genus of stem-turtle

Bartassochersis is an extinct genus of stem-turtle in the testudinatan family Proterochersidae, known from the Late Triassic (Rhaetian age) Rhaetian Formation of France. The genus contains a single species, Bartassochersis lopezi, known from a fragmentary shell and skeleton. It is the first testudinatan named from the Rhaetian of Europe, and the second named from this age worldwide.

== Discovery and naming ==
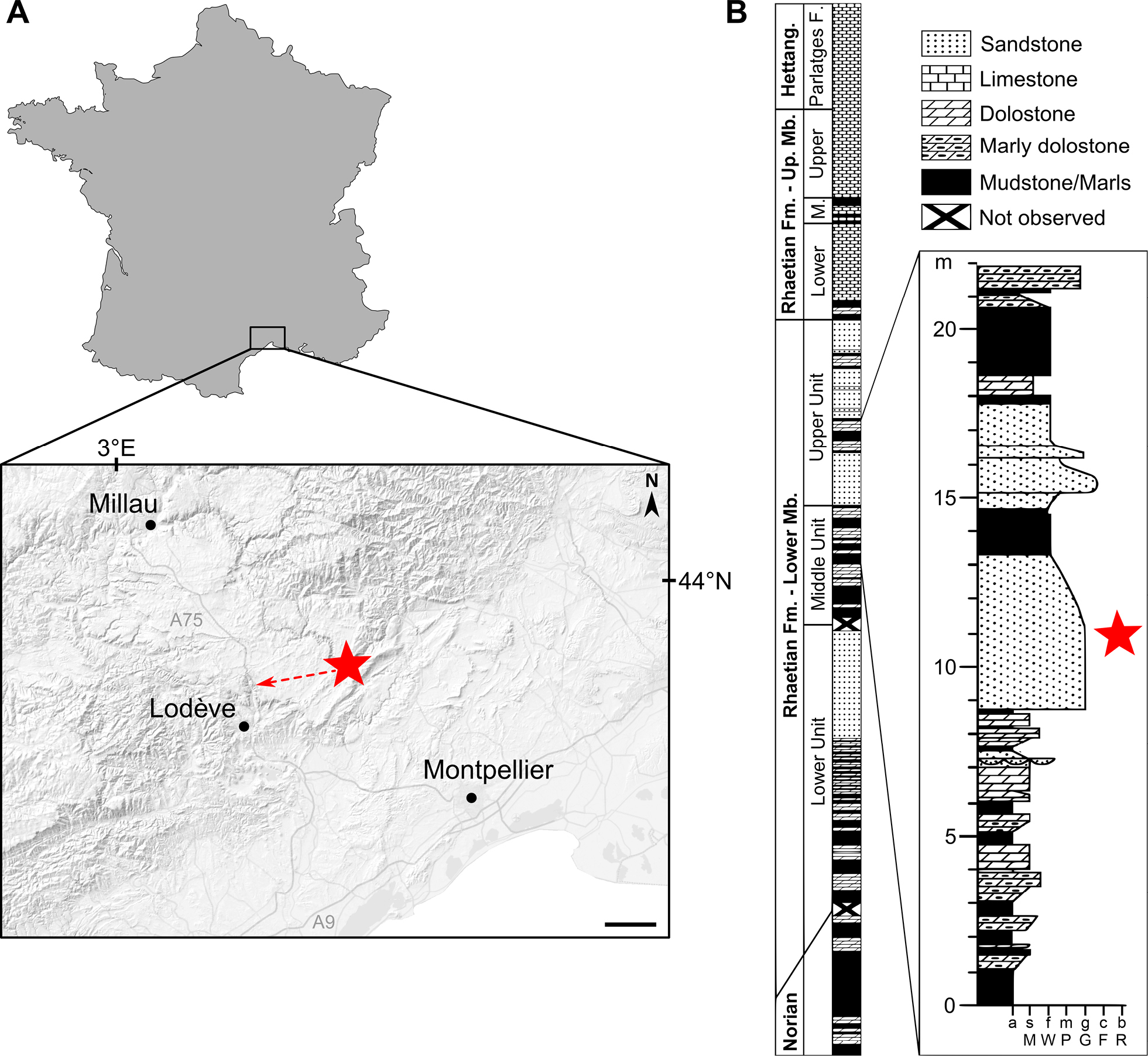
B. lopezi type locality and stratigraphic position [★]

The Bartassochersis fossil material was collected from a large sandstone boulder deriving from cliff outcrops of the Rhaetian Formation in Pégairolles-de-l'Escalette, Occitania region, of southern France. This boulder, about 5 metres (16 ft) across, had fallen from the cliff, but the exact layer from which it originated could be identified based on shared sedimentological structures. Specimens were collected from an area of around 2 m^{2} (22 ft^{2}) on the boulder's eastern wall. Some of this sampling occurred in the late 1990s, though most of the collection was more recent, in 2020 and 2025, using a concrete saw to extract pieces. The specimens are housed in the paleontological collections at the University of Montpellier, where they are permanently accessioned as specimens UM-PDE2-01–06, 08–17, and 19–21. The remains likely belong to a single individual, as suggested by the absence of duplicated elements, but they are highly fragmented. Identified material comprises several pieces of the shell (including parts of the carapace and plastron), partial left scapula, and a complete ungual (claw).

In 2026, Tomasz Szczygielski and colleagues described Bartassochersis lopezi as a new genus and species of stem-turtle based on these fossil remains, designating them as the holotype specimen. The generic name, Bartassochersis, is derived from the Occitan verb bartasser (a derivative of the word barta, referring to an area of scrub vegetation), which refers to walking through brush without a clear path. This root was chosen to allude to the methods required to prospect and collect the only known specimen. It is combined with the Greek word χερσις (khérsĭs), meaning 'tortoise', analogous to the suffix used in the name of the closely-related genus Proterochersis. The specific name, lopezi, honours geologist Michel Lopez, the discoverer of the fossil site from which the holotype was collected, and his research on the geology of the type locality.

The description of Bartassochersis marks the first European stem-turtle to be named from the Rhaetian age. Furthermore, it is only the second Rhaetian stem-turtle named worldwide, following the description of the australochelyid Waluchelys from Argentina in 2020. All other named proterochersids (members of the clade to which Barassochersis belongs) are known from slightly older Norian-aged rocks.

== Description ==
The shell fragments of both the carapace and plastron of Bartassochersis exhibit fine ornamentation patterns—comprising branching and undulating vascular imprints, in addition to small vascular openings—typical of proterochersids. Based on the relatively large size of the B. lopezi holotype and the prominent caudal processes of the plastron, this individual was likely nearing skeletal maturity when it died. Skeletal fusion is often a signal of maturity, and none of the preserved sutures between elements are open in B. lopezi, though the shell components of proterochersids ankylose (fuse together) early in ontogeny.

The preserved ungual is generally straight, suggesting it is a manual (hand)—rather than pedal (foot)—ungual. It is somewhat asymmetrical, a condition not seen in other stem-turtles like Palaeochersis and Proganochelys. This could be explained by the position of the ungual within the autopodium (where on the hand the claw was located) or the side of the body the ungual was located on (left or right hand). Alternatively, it may be the result of a pathology (injury that occurred in life) or taphonomic distortion.

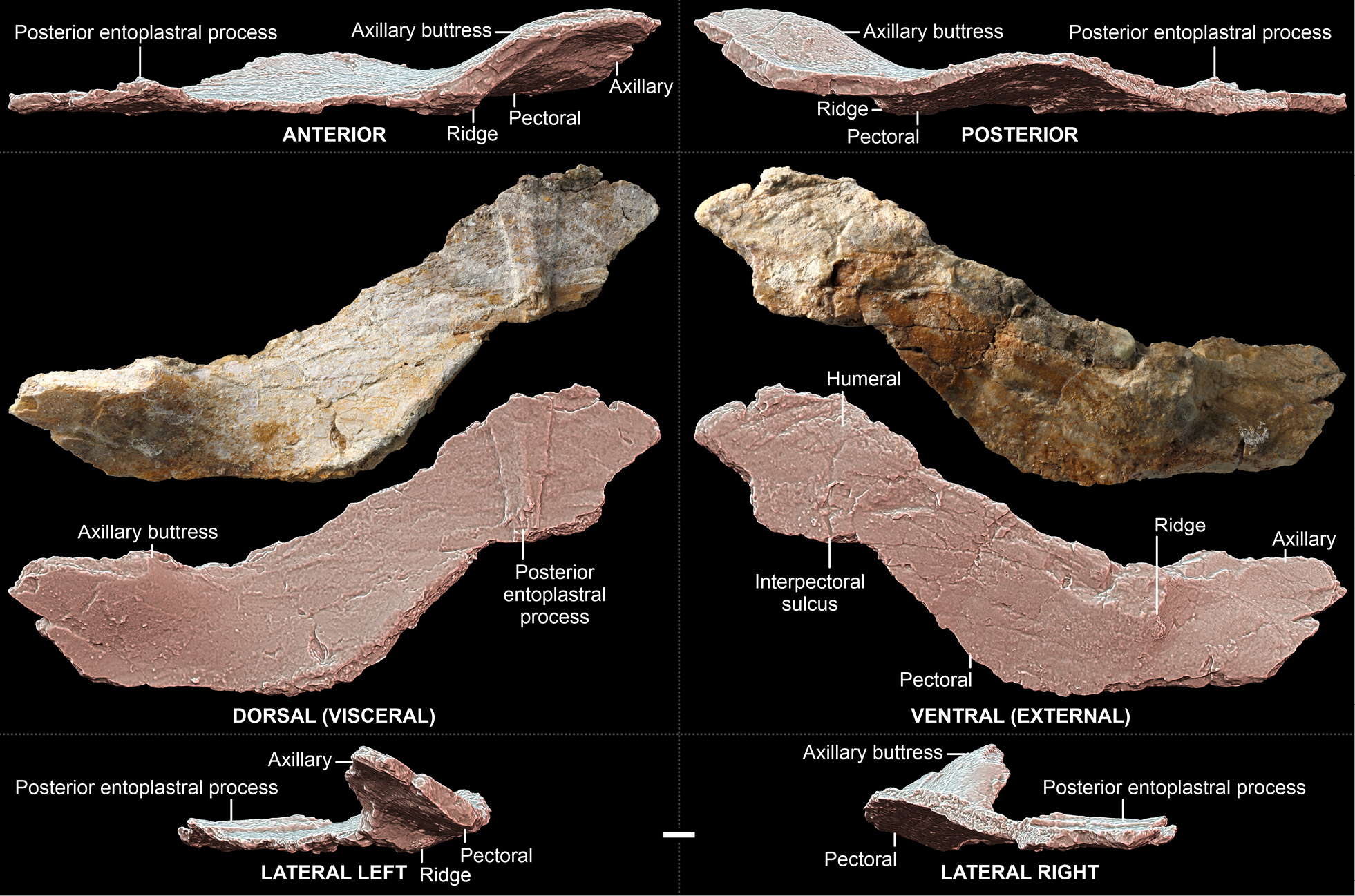
UM-PDE2-01, plastron fragment

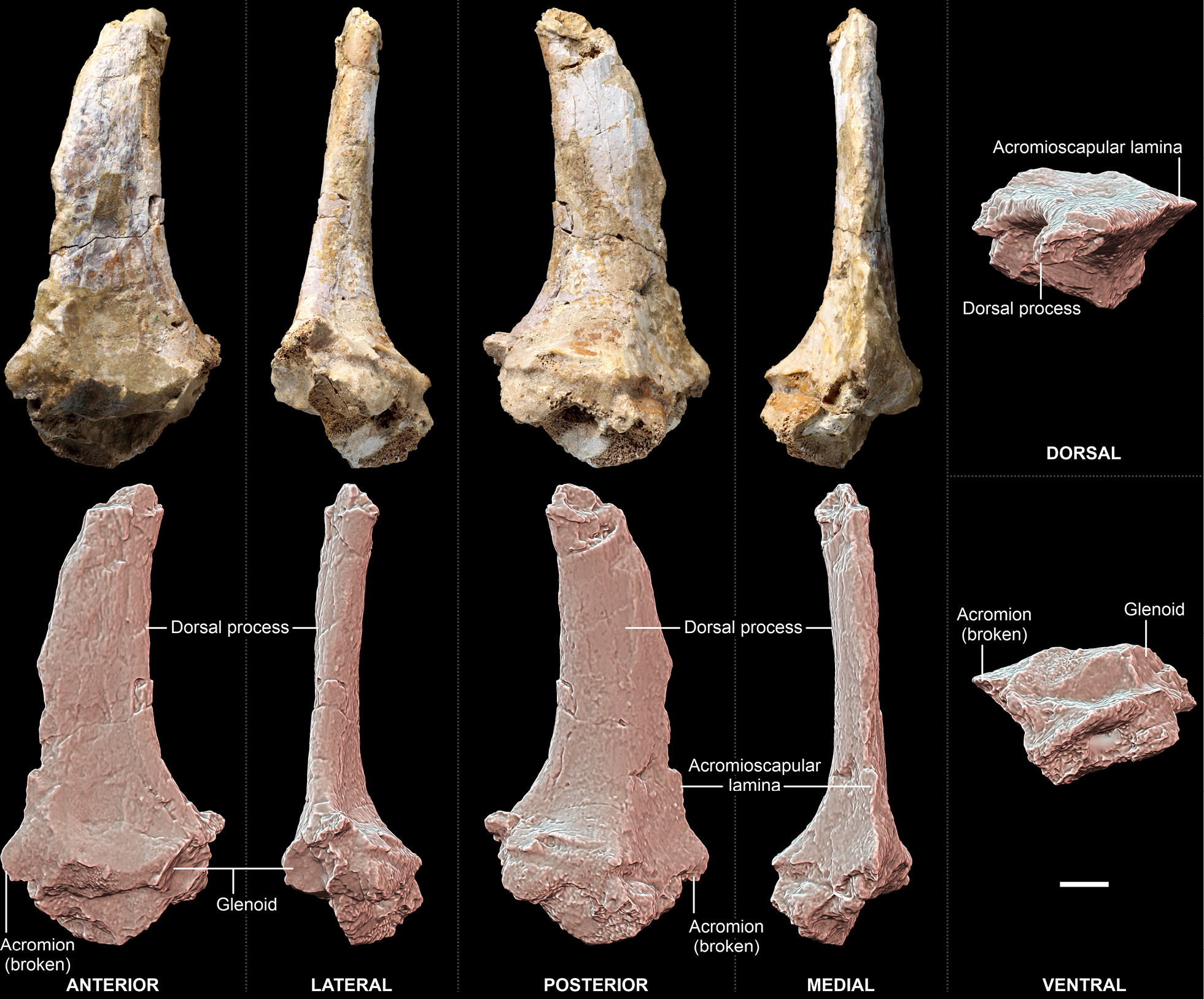
UM-PDE2-05, left scapula

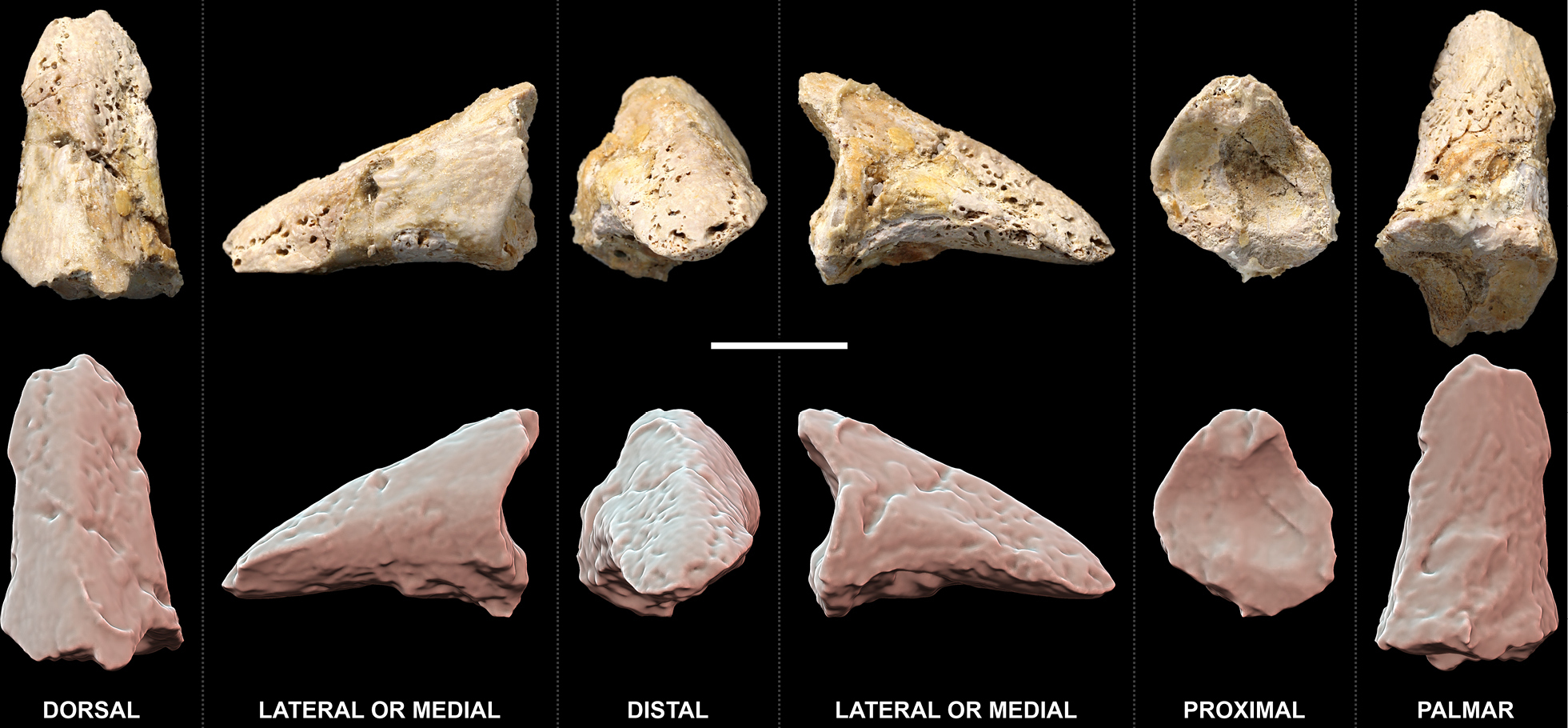
UM-PDE2-06, ungual

== Classification ==
To test the affinities and relationships of Bartassochersis, Szczygielski et al. (2026) included it in an updated version of the phylogenetic matrix of Szczygielski & Dróżdż (2026). Bartassochersis was recovered as a stem-turtle (early-diverging member of Testudinata outside of the turtle crown group, Testudines), within the family Proterochersidae. The interrelationships of this clade were poorly resolved, with many nodes reduced to a polytomy. These results are displayed in the cladogram below:

- Pantestudines
  - †Pappochelys rosinae
  - - †Eorhynchochelys sinensis
    - - †Odontochelys semitestacea
      - Testudinata
        - - †Proganochelyidae
            - †Proganochelys quenstedtii
            - †Ypomonetikochelys euryaspis
          - †Australochelyidae
            - †Australochelys africanus
            - †Palaeochersis talampayensis
            - †Waluchelys cavitesta
        - - †Proterochersidae
            - †Bartassochersis lopezi
            - †Chinlechelys tenertesta
            - †Thaichelys ruchae
            - - †Cryptochersis paraxene
              - †Keuperotesta limendorsa
            - - †Proterochersis porebensis
              - †Proterochersis robusta
          - - Mesochelydia (to modern turtles ⇒)
