= Turtle classification =

Topic in reptilian phylogenetics

Turtles have been classified in different ways by different authors. While they were previously considered anapsids, they are now considered more derived. Recent analyses of molecular evidence have strongly suggested that they belong in the clade Archosauromorpha (also known as Archelosauria). Below are many of the possible classifications of Testudines and Testudinata:

== Thomson and Shaffer, 2010 ==
Below is a cladogram of living testudines found by Thomson and Shaffer in 2010:

- Testudines
  - Pleurodira
    - Pelomedusoides
      - Pelusios subniger
      - Pelomedusidae
        - - Pelusios gabonensis
          - Pelusios williamsi
        - - Pelomedusa subrufa
          - Pelusios sinuatus
      - Podocnemididae
        - Peltocephalus dumerilianus
        - Podocnemis unifilis
        - Podocnemis lewyana
        - - Podocnemis expansa
          - Erymnochelys madagascariensis
    - Chelidae
      - Chelodininae
        - - Chelodina rugosa
          - - Chelodina longicollis
            - Chelodina oblonga
        - - Pseudemydura umbrina
          - - Emydura subglobosa
            - - Elseya dentata
              - Elseya latisternum
              - Rheodytes leukops
              - - Elusor macrurus
                - Elseya purvisi
              - - Elseya georgesi
                - Emydura macquarii
      - - Hydromedusa tectifera
        - Chelinae
          - Chelus fimbriata
          - - Platemys platycephala
            - - Mesoclemmys nasuta
              - Mesoclemmys gibba
            - - Acanthochelys radiolata
              - - Acanthochelys spixii
                - Acanthochelys pallidipectoris
            - - Mesoclemmys hogei
              - - Phrynops williamsi
                - - Phrynops geoffroanus
                  - Phrynops hilarii
  - - Trionychia
      - Carettochelys insculpta
      - Trionychidae
        - Cyclanorbinae
          - - Lissemys scutata
            - Lissemys punctata
          - - - Cycloderma frenatum
              - Cycloderma aubryi
            - - Cyclanorbis senegalensis
              - Cyclanorbis elegans
        - Trionychinae
          - - Trionyx triunguis
            - - - Pelochelys bibroni
                - Pelochelys cantorii
              - - Chitra vandijki
                - - Chitra indica
                  - Chitra chitra
          - - - Rafetus euphraticus
              - - Apalone mutica
                - - Apalone ferox
                  - Apalone spinifera
            - - - Pelodiscus sinensis
                - Pelodiscus axenaria
              - - Palea steindachneri
                - - Dogania subplana
                  - - Amyda cartilaginea
                    - - Nilssonia gangetica
                      - - Nilssonia formosa
                        - Nilssonia hurum
    - See below for Chelydridae, Chelonioidea, Kinosternoidea,
      Platysternidae, Emydidae, Testudinidae and Geoemydidae

== Sterli 2010 ==
Below is a cladogram found by Sterli in 2010 in a phylogenetic analysis of Pleurodira:

- Testudinata
  - †Proganochelys quenstedti
  - Rhaptochelydia
    - †Australochelyidae
      - †Palaeochersis talampayensis
      - †Australochelys africanus
    - - †Proterochersis robusta
      - - †Kayentachelys aprix
        - †Condorchelys antiqua
        - †Heckerochelys romani
        - †Indochelys spatulata
        - - - †Mongolochelys efremovi
            - †Meiolaniidae
              - †Meiolania platyceps
              - †Niolamia argentina
          - †Chubutemys copelloi
          - - †Kallokibotion bajazidi
            - - †Santanachelys gaffneyi
              - - †Solnhofia parsonsi
                - - - †Plesiochelyidae
                      - †Portlandemys macdowelli
                      - †Plesiochelys solodurensis
                    - - †Dorsetochelys delairi
                      - †Thalassemys moseri
                      - Pleurosternidae
                        - †Pleurosternon bullockii
                        - - †Glyptops plicatulus
                          - †Dinochelys whitei
                      - Baenidae
                        - †Neurankylus eximius
                        - - †Trinitichelys hiatti
                          - - †Plesiobaena antiqua
                            - †Boremys pulchra
                            - - †Baena arenosa
                              - †Chisternon undulatum
                  - - †Siamochelys peninsularis
                    - †Xinjiangchelys latimarginalis
                    - Testudines see tree below

- Testudines
  - - - †Hangaiemys hoburensis
      - †Judithemys sukhanovi
      - - †Dracochelys bicuspis
        - - †Sinemys lens
          - †Ordosemys leios
    - Chelonioidea
      - †Toxochelys latiremys
      - †Mesodermochelys undulatus
      - Dermochelys coriacea
      - Cheloniidae
        - Caretta caretta
        - Chelonia mydas
  - - Testudinoidea
      - Platysternon megacephalum
      - - †Mongolemys elegans
        - - Emydidae
            - Chrysemys picta
            - Trachemys scripta
          - - Geoclemys hamiltonii
            - Testudinidae
              - Gopherus polyphemus
              - Chelonoidis chilensis
    - - - †Protochelydra zangerli
        - Chelydridae
          - Macroclemys temminckii
          - Chelydra serpentina
      - - †Emarginachelys cretacea
        - - Kinosternoidea
            - †Baptemys wyomingensis
            - Dermatemys mawii
            - †Hoplochelys crassa
            - Kinosternidae
              - Staurotypus triporcatus
              - - Sternotherus odoratus
                - Kinosternon flavescens
          - - - †Adocus beati
              - - †Zangerlia neimongolensis
                - †Basilemys variolosa
            - - - †Peltochelys durlstoensis
                - - †Anosteira ornata
                  - Carettochelys insculpta
                  - Trionychidae
                    - Lissemys punctata
                    - - Apalone spinifera
                      - Pelodiscus sinensis
              - †Sandownia harrisi
              - Pleurodira
                - - †Platychelys oberndorferi
                  - †Caribemys oxfordiensis
                  - †Notoemys laticentralis
                - Chelidae
                  - - Phrynops geoffroanus
                    - Chelus fimbriata
                  - - - Elseya dentata
                      - Elseya latisternum
                    - - Chelodina oblonga
                      - Chelodina longicollis
                - Pelomedusoides
                  - Pelomedusa subrufa
                  - - Erymnochelys madagascariensis
                    - Podocnemis expansa

== Joyce, 2007 ==
Below is a cladogram found by Joyce in 2007 in his publication on turtle phylogeny:

- Testudinata
  - Proganochelys quenstedti
  - - Palaeochersis talampayensis
    - Australochelys africanus
    - - Proterochersis robusta
      - - Kayentachelys aprix
        - - - Meiolania platyceps
            - Mongolochelys efremovi
          - - Kallokibotion bajazidi
            - Testudines
              - - Platychelys oberndorferi
                - - Caribemys oxfordiensis
                  - - Notoemys laticentralis
                    - Pleurodira
                      - Chelidae
                        - Elseya dentata
                        - Phyrops geoffroanus
                        - Chelodina siebenrocki
                      - Pelomedusoides
                        - Podocnemis expansa
                        - Pelomedusa subrufa
                        - Erymnochelys madagascariensis
              - - - Dorsetochelys delairi
                  - Paracryptodira
                    - Pleurosternidae
                      - Pleurosternon bullockii
                      - - Glyptops plicatulus
                        - Dinochelys whitei
                    - Baenidae
                      - Neurankylus eximius
                      - - Trinitichelys hiatti
                        - - Plesiobaena antiqua
                          - - Boremys pulchra
                            - - Baena arenosa
                              - Chisternon undatum
                - Eucryptodira
                  - Plesiochelys solodurensis
                  - Portlandemys mcdowelli
                  - - - Solnhofia parsonsi
                      - - - Thalassemys moseri
                          - Sandownia harrisi
                        - Santanachelys gaffneyi
                    - - Xinjiangchelys latimarginalis
                      - - Hangaiemys hoburensis
                        - - - Judithemys sukhavoni
                            - - Dracochelys bicuspis
                              - - Sinemys lens
                                - Ordosemys leios
                          - See tree below for Cryptodira

- Cryptodira
  - - Toxochelys latiremis
    - Chelonioidea
      - - Mesodermochelys undulatus
        - Dermochelys coriacea
      - Cheloniidae
        - Chelonia mydas
        - Caretta caretta
  - - - Protochelydra zangerli
      - Chelydridae
        - Chelydra serpentina
        - Macrochelys temmincki
    - - Platysternon megacephalum
      - - - Mongolemys elegans
          - Testudinoidea
            - Gopherus polyphemus
            - - Geoclemys hamiltoni
              - Chrysemys picta
        - Trionychoidea
          - - Emarginachelys cretacea
            - Kinosternoidea
              - - Baptemys wyomingensis
                - Dermatemys mawii
              - - Hoplochelys crassa
                - - Staurotypus triporcatus
                  - - Sternotherus odoratus
                    - Kinosternon scorpioides
          - Pantrionychia
            - Adocidae
              - Adocus beati
              - - Basilemys variolosa
                - Zangerlia neimongolensis
            - - Peltochelys durlstonensis
              - Trionychia
                - Pancarettochelyidae
                  - Pseudanosteria pulchra
                  - Carettochelys insculpta
                - Trionychidae
                  - Lisemys punctata
                  - Apalone ferox

== See also ==
Wikipedia category tree of Testudines taxonomy
