= Eileanchelys =

Eileanchelys Temporal range: Middle Jurassic, 164 Ma

Scientific classification
- Kingdom: Animalia
- Phylum: Chordata
- Class: Reptilia
- Clade: Pantestudines
- Clade: Testudinata
- Clade: Mesochelydia
- Genus: †Eileanchelys; Anquetin et al., 2009

Type species
- Eileanchelys waldmani Anquetin et al., 2009

Extinct genus of turtles

Eileanchelys is an extinct genus of primitive turtle from the Middle Jurassic (Bathonian) period some 164 million years ago of Britain. Only one species is recorded, Eileanchelys waldmani. It is the best-represented turtle from the Middle Jurassic, because of the amount of specimens that can be assigned to it. The turtle is also one of the oldest turtles ever found to be aquatic, and might represent a milestone in turtle evolution.

== Discovery and naming ==
In 2009, two specimens from the National Museums of Scotland, Edinburgh, including NMS G 2004.31.15 and NMS G 2004.31.16a–f, were found to differ from other turtles from the area and age. It was decided that they represented a new genus and species, and were named Eileanchelys waldmani by Jérémy Anquetin and his colleagues. The specimen NMS G 2004.31.15 was designated as the holotype, and NMS G 2004.31.16a-f, the paratypes. NMS G 2004.31.16 includes at least five, and possibly six, different individuals, all in one block. The holotype of Eileanchelys is a partial skull. Both blocks were found in Cladach a'Ghlinne, Scotland.

=== Etymology ===
Eileanchelys waldmani was named and described by Anquetin et al. in 2009. The generic name, eilean, comes from the Scottish Gaelic word for island, and chelys, from the Greek word for turtle. The species was named in honour of Dr. Michael Waldman who found its remains, as well as the first Scottish Jurassic mammal, after rediscovering the Cladach a'Ghlinne locality.

== Description ==
Eileanchelys is a small turtle, with an approximate carapace length of 20 to 30 centimetres (7.9 to 11.8 in). The preserved carapaces of Eileanchelys are all slightly crushed, but show that they were lightly domed in real life. Therefore, the morphology of its shell was similar to Kayentachelys. There is a fused connection of the carapace and plastron in Eileanchelys. The connection is not found in Heckerochelys, but is in Kayentachelys.

=== Distinguishing characteristics ===
Eileanchelys is characterized by the following features: the presence of nasal; elongated postorbital skull; absence of flooring of the cavum acustico-jugulare; processus interfenestralis of the opisthotic more slender than that of more basal forms but more robust than that of crown-group turtles; separate openings of the canalis cavernosum and canalis stapedio-temporalis present within the cavum acustico-jugulare; a reduced thickness of the basicranium floor comparable with that of crown-group turtles; well-developed antrum postoticum; flat and horizontal vomer that is free of contacts for most of its length except at its extremities and along a short suture with the prefrontal; absence of processus trochlearis oticum; posteroventrally open incisura columellae auris; at least eight neurals (an additional plate between neural 8 and suprapygal 1 may be a ninth neural or a supernumerary suprapygal), two broad suprapygals, and eight costals present; absence of carapacial or plastral fontanelle in adult individuals; one short but broad cervical scute present; vertebral scutes wider than pleurals; vertebral 3–4 sulcus on neural 6; reduced cleithrum present; arrow-shaped entoplastron that does not separate the epiplastra anteriorly; one pair of mesoplastra that meet medially; one small pair of extragulars present; and anal scute that does not reach the hypoplastron.

== Classification ==
Eileanchelys is a stable taxon, which means that its classification does not differ much in cladograms. It is related to both Heckerochelys and Kayentachelys, although often it is found to be derived from the later. The below cladogram illustrates the relationships of basal testudinata:

- Testudinata
  - Hypothetical ancestor
  - Proganochelys quenstedti
  - - Palaeochersis talampayensis
    - - Australochelys africanus
      - - Proterochersis robusta
        - - Kayentachelys aprix
          - - - Eileanchelys waldmani
              - Heckerochelys romani
            - - Condorchelys antiqua
              - - - Meiolania platyceps
                  - Mongolochelys efremovi
                - Testudines

== Paleoecology ==
=== Habitat ===
Eileanchelys lived in the Kilmaluag Formation, which has a Late Bathonian age. The formation is made up entirely of mudstone, shale and some limestone, and, as many aquatic types of animals have been found in it and land vertebrates are rare, it was almost certainly marine. Therefore, Eileanchelys was most likely was an aquatic turtle, swimming throughout lagoons and lakes, rather than terrestrial animal that died in a body of water. It is therefore one of the oldest, and best known, extinct aquatic turtles, and might represent a new evolutionary stage of turtle.

=== Fauna ===
Eileanchelys existed in the Kilmaluag Formation of the Great Estuarine Group. This formation has an abundance of tetrapod fauna, including salamanders; the choristodere Cteniogenys sp.; crocodilians; the lepidosauromorph Marmoretta sp.; various lizards; pterosaurs; dinosaurs; the synapsid Stereognathus hebridicus; and early mammals.
