= Chinlechelys =

Chinlechelys Temporal range: Late Triassic, 210–208 Ma

Scientific classification
- Kingdom: Animalia
- Phylum: Chordata
- Class: Reptilia
- Clade: Pantestudines
- Clade: Testudinata
- Genus: †Chinlechelys; Joyce et al., 2009

Type species
- Chinlechelys tenertesta Joyce et al., 2009

Extinct genus of turtles

Chinlechelys (/tʃɪnəltʃɛliːs/ meaning Chinle turtle) is an extinct genus of stem-turtle belonging to Testudinata. It lived in the Norian age of the Late Triassic and is the oldest turtle known from North America. Among turtles it is unique, mostly because of its very thin shell. The type and only species, C. tenertesta, was named and described with the genus by Walter G. Joyce et al. in 2009. It was probably terrestrial, and was found by Joyce et al. to be closely related to Proganochelys, another terrestrial testudinatan.

== Discovery and naming ==
Chinlechelys is known from only one assigned specimen, the holotype NMMNH P-16697 (New Mexico Museum of Natural History and Science) recovered from the Norian Bull Canyon Formation (New Mexico, United States). The skeleton consists of the middle of the carapace, the left hypoplastron, rear ribs, a neck spine, isolated osteoderms, and portions of the bridge. The materials were collected separately over several years, but exhibit the same preservation, features, and are all from the same area, so they were assigned to the same individual.

Chinlechelys remains were later described from Petrified Forest National Park in Arizona, in strata of the Chinle Formation's Owl Rock Member.

=== Etymology ===
Chinlechelys tenertesta was named by Walter G. Joyce et al. in 2009. The generic name is derived from chinle, after the Triassic Chinle Group, and chelys, Greek for "turtle". Tener and testa and based on the Latin words for "delicate" and "shell", respectively, based on the thinness of its shell. Although the initial description regarded the Bull Canyon Formation as part of the Chinle Group, other studies consider these strata to be part of the Dockum Group instead.

== Description ==
Chinlechelys is a unique turtle, and was preserved to have an extremely thin shell. Even though the shell has an estimated length of 35 cm (14 in), the thickest section, above the keel, is only 3 mm (0.12 in) thick, with the average shell thickness being 1 mm (0.039 in). The shell thickness makes Chinlechelys the thinnest-shelled turtle known from a fully grown shell. The other well-discussed materials of Chinlechelys are dermal osteoderms. Two prominent spines, from the neck region, are well-preserved. They were decidedly not from the edge of the shell, because large amounts of the region of the carapace they would be from were preserved. Also, the pair of osteoderms were unlikely to be from the tail, because of a comparison with Proganochelys. Some spines from the shell are known from Chinlechelys, but it was considered likely that they were extended fully around the shell because of their presence on Proganochelys.

=== Distinguishing characteristics ===
Chinlechelys can be distinguished from both derived amniotes and primitive turtles based on the below features, noticed by Joyce et al.: the presence of a plastron, carapace and multi-element neck and tail armour; dorsal centra hourglass-shaped, platycoelous, and with a distinct ventral keel; dorsal ribs in contact two dorsal vertebrae; the appearance of compressed dorsal ribs that are oriented vertically and only lightly associated with overlying dermal armour; a double contact between the dorsal vertebrae and dorsal ribs only incipient; the carapace and most of plastron laminar in thickness; a carapace with distinct medial ridge that widens towards the end; a plastron with a sloping inguinal notch; and neck armour prongs forming an angular cone.

== Classification ==
Chinlechelys was determined to be a primitive genus, assigned as a relative of Proganochelys in Testudinata. Its armouring shows the evolution of the turtle carapace, and although some basal features like thin ribs suggest a more primitive placement. The cladogram below shows the suspected relationships of Chinlechelys, along with Pronganochelys, Kayentachelys and other basal turtles:

- Testudinata
  - Proganochelys quenstedti
  - Chinlechelys tenertesta
  - - Palaeochersis talampayensis
    - Australochelys africanus
    - - Proterochersis robusta
      - - Kayentachelys aprix
        - - Mongolochelys efremovi
          - - Panpleurodira
            - Pancryptodira

=== Evolutonary implications ===
Joyce et al. (2009) interpret the "poor association" of the ribs and vertebrae to the coastals as evidence that the turtle shell did not evolve exclusively from endoskeletal elements but also from dermal armor, with both parts becoming completely fused in later turtles. After the discovery of Odontochelys, which possessed a plastron but not a carapace, Joyce (2017) rejected C. tenertesta's status as a good representative of the ancestral turtle morphology. Because of this, it was instead considered a likely relative of Proganochelys quenstedtii and classified in the same genus, creating the new combination Proganochelys tenertesta.

Lichtig & Lucas (2021), however, maintain that Chinlechelys tenertesta represents the ancestral morphology and habits. Their phylogenetic analysis places turtles close to Anthodon, a parareptile with multiple rows of osteoderms. Chinlechelys is in a more basal position than Odontochelys, which the authors see as a derived aquatic form that either lost the carapace or possessed an unfused carapace that was not preserved during fossilization.

- - Scutosaurus
  - Bradysaurus
- - Anthodon
  - Testudinata
    - Chinlechelys
    - - Odontochelys
      - Proganochelys

Moreover, they reject a close relationship between Testudinata and Eunotosaurus and/or Pappochelys, otherwise considered stem-turtles supporting an osteoderm-free origin of the carapace. In their analysis, the former is placed in Synapsida and the latter in (or near) Sauropterygia.
