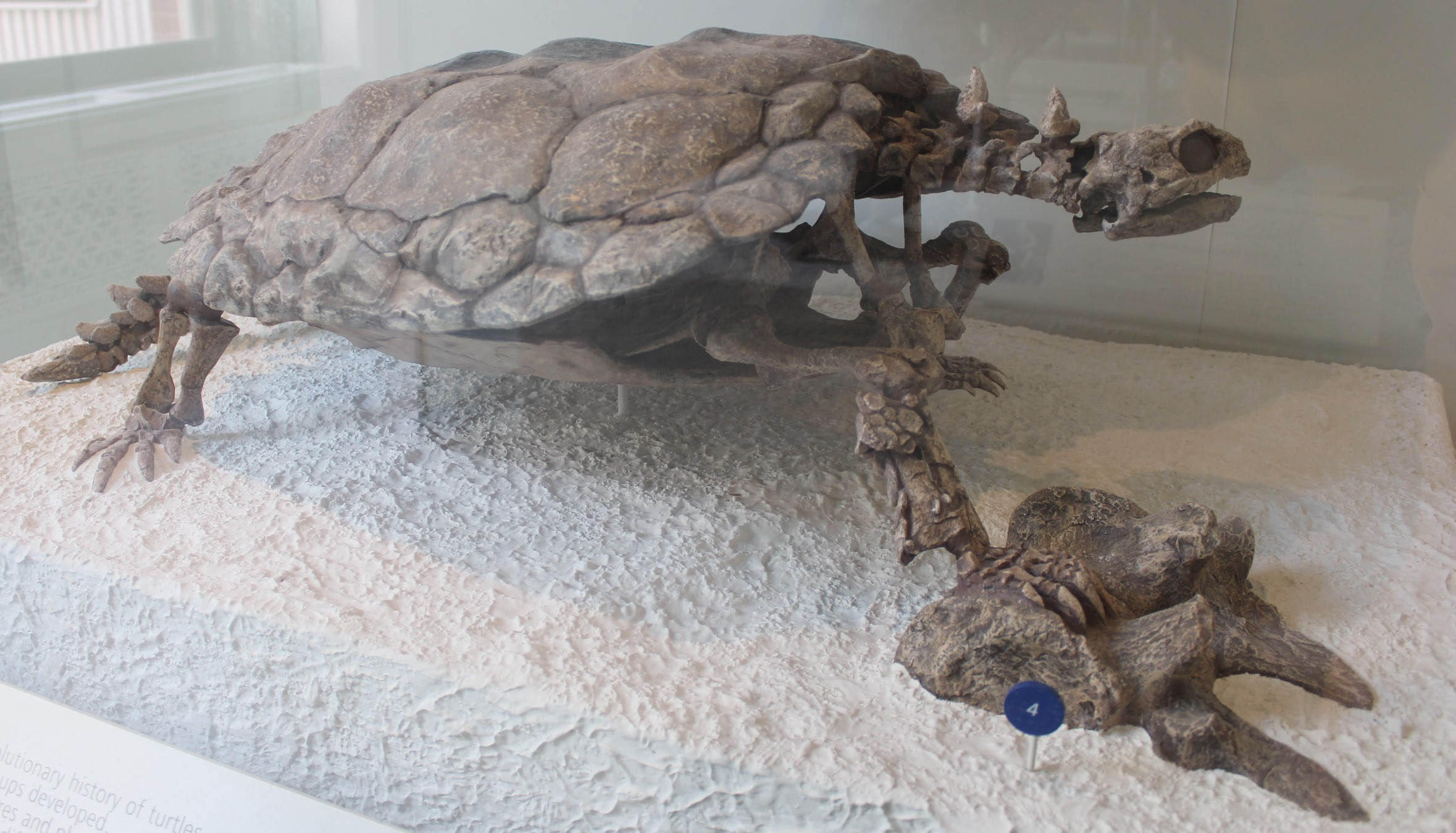
- Skeleton of Proganochelys quenstedtii, American Museum of Natural History

Scientific classification
- Kingdom: Animalia
- Phylum: Chordata
- Class: Reptilia
- Clade: Pantestudines
- Clade: Testudinata
- Family: †Proganochelyidae
- Genus: †Proganochelys; Baur, 1887
- Species: †P. quenstedtii

Binomial name
- †Proganochelys quenstedtii Baur, 1887

Synonyms
- Psammochelys Quenstedt, 1889; Stegochelys Jaekel, 1914 non Lydekker, 1889; Triassochelys Jaekel, 1918

= Proganochelys =

Proganochelys Temporal range: Late Triassic, 210 Ma

Extinct genus of turtles

Proganochelys is a genus of extinct, primitive stem-turtle. Proganochelys was named by Georg Baur in 1887 as the oldest turtle in existence at the time. The name Proganochelys comes from the Greek word ganos meaning 'brightness', combined with prefix pro, 'before', and Greek base chelys meaning 'turtle'. Proganochelys is believed to have been around 1 meter in size and herbivorous in nature. Proganochelys had been known as the most primitive stem-turtle for over a century, until the novel discovery of Odontochelys in 2008. Odontochelys and Proganochelys share unique primitive features that are not found in Casichelydia, such as tooth-like structures on the pterygoid and vomer and a plate-like coracoid.

Proganochelys quenstedtii is the only known species of this genus and is among the oldest known stem-turtle species with a complete shell discovered to date, known from fossils found in Germany and Switzerland in strata from the late Triassic, dating to approximately 210 million years ago. The Thailand species "P." ruchae was later described as a separate genus Thaichelys, and the previously referred Greenland fossil was redescribed as a separate genus of Proganochelyidae, Ypomonetikochelys.

Psammochelys, Stegochelys, and Triassochelys are junior synonyms of Proganochelys. Chelytherium von Meyer, 1863 has been considered a synonym of Proganochelys by some authors, but Joyce (2017) considers it a nomen dubium given the fragmentary nature of the syntype material. Joyce (2017) also considered North American genus Chinlechelys to be a junior synonym of Proganochelys, though the author maintains the type species of the former genus, C. tenertesta, as a distinct species within the genus Proganochelys.

== Description and paleobiology ==
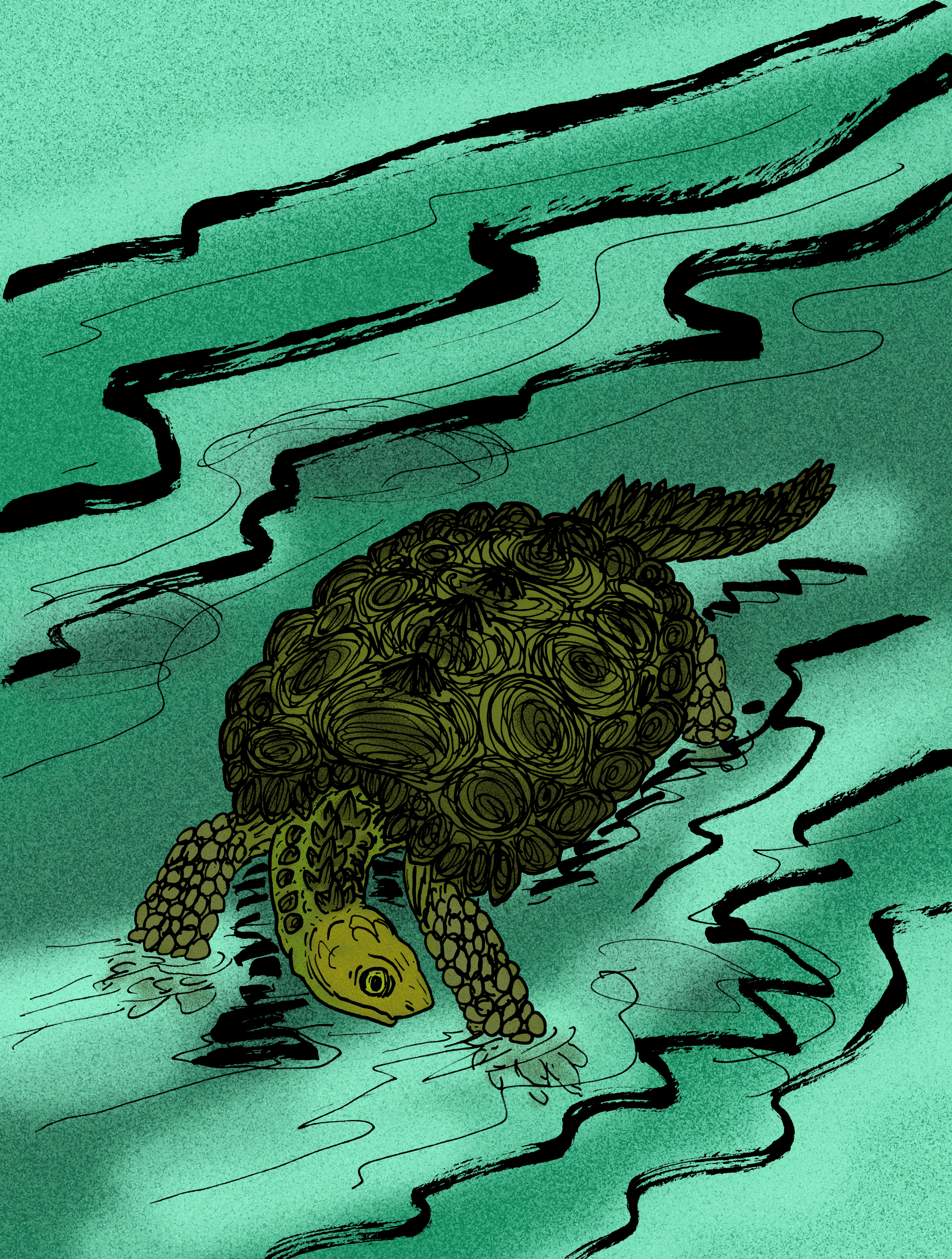
Restoration

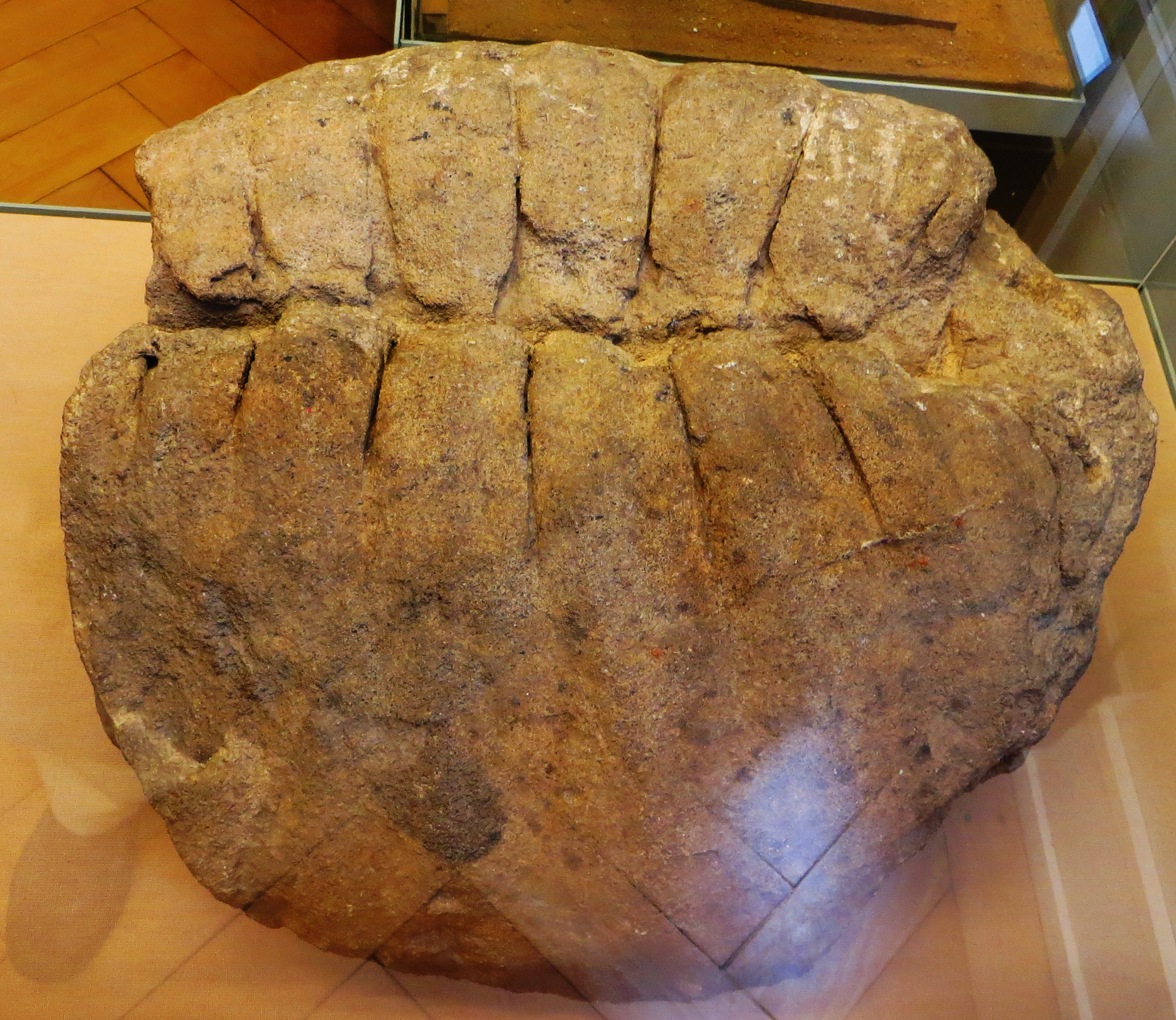
Type specimen

Proganochelys was once considered to be the oldest known stem-turtle until the description of Odontochelys and Eorhynchochelys, two slightly earlier genera that lived in the Carnian stage of the Triassic. Proganochelys had a fully developed shell 60–70 cm (2.0–2.3 ft) long. The total length of Proganochelys was about 91 cm (3 ft). Its overall appearance resembled modern turtles in many respects: it lacked teeth on the upper and lower jaw, likely had a beak and had the characteristic heavily armored shell formed from bony plates and ribs which fused together into a solid cage around the internal organs. Proganochelys had a semi-beak like structure along with denticles fused to its vomer. The plates comprising the carapace and plastron were already in the modern form, although there were additional plates along the margins of the shell that would have served to protect the legs. Also, unlike any modern species of turtle, its long tail had spikes and terminated in a club, its head could not be retracted under the shell, and its neck may have been protected by small spines. While it had no teeth in its jaws, it did have small denticles on the palate. The beak like structure suggests that the Triassic stem-turtles evolved from carnivorous stem-turtles to herbivorous as the loss of teeth and gain of the beak would benefit the crushing of plants in these stem-turtles.

=== Synapomorphies and autapomorphies ===
Proganochelys possesses several chelonian synapomorphies including: a bony shell containing fused ribs, neural bones with fused thoracic segments, and a carapace and plastron that enclose the pelvic and shoulder girdle. Proganochelys was also known for its autapomorphies, which included a tail club and a tubercle on the basioccipital. The tail of Proganochelys was noticeably long and is hypothesized to have been used as a club for protection against predators. Although evolution of the shell has been clearly defined, the mechanisms behind the movement of the neck have been a subject of debate for Proganochelys. It has been hypothesized that Proganochelys were able to retract their necks by tucking in their skull under the front of their shell when needed, perhaps in a similar fashion to some modern side-necked turtles.

=== Shell ===
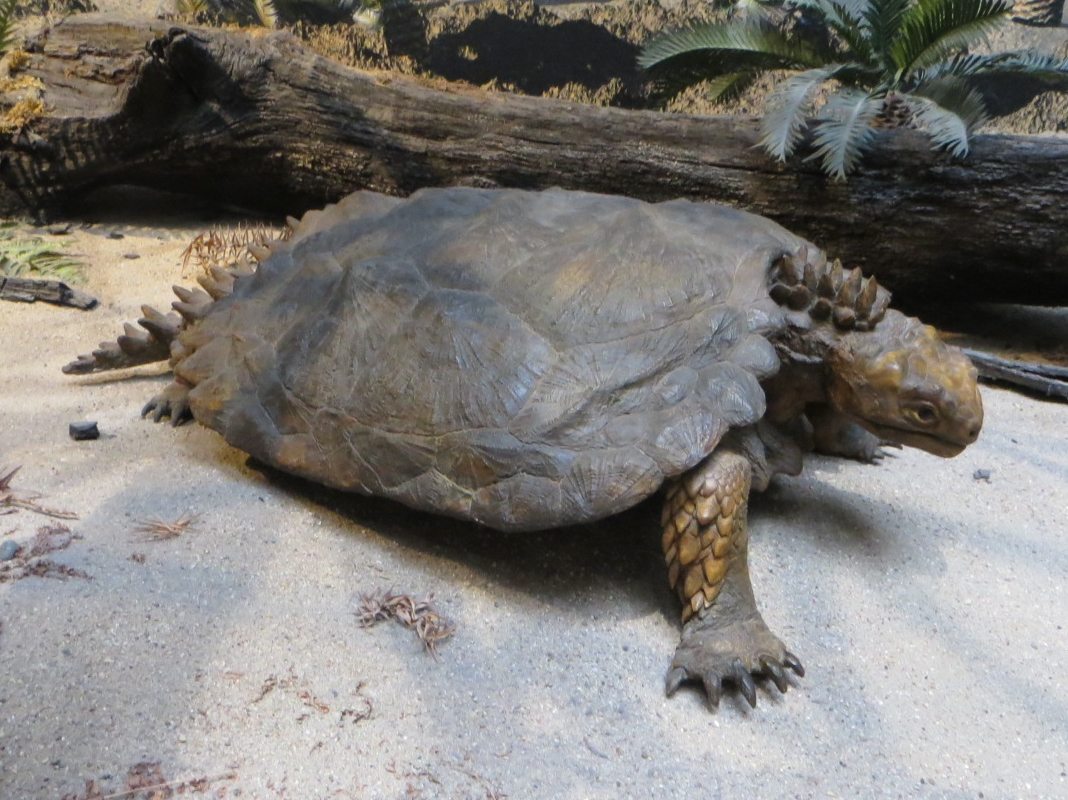
Life restoration of Proganochelys

The broadened ribs on Proganochelys show "metaplastic ossification of the dermis". The enlarged ribs suggest that the endochondral rib ossifications were joined by a second ossification instead of having expanded ribs. The 220-million-year-old stem-turtle Odontochelys only has a partially formed shell. Odontochelys is believed to only possess a plastron. The 5-million-year difference that distinguish Odontochelys from Proganochelys tell us that the evolution of the shell occurred relatively quickly in time. Proganochelys possessed both a carapace, and a plastron. The shell is believed to have been used for protection against predators. Proganochelys fits well into the order as a turtle, as the shell of Proganochelys is in agreement with the evolution of other stem-turtles.

=== Skull ===
The dermal roofing elements of Proganochelys include a large nasal, a fully roofed skull, a flat squamosal, and an absent pineal foramen. Palatal characteristics include paired vomers, and a dorsal process containing premaxilla. An open interpterygoid vacuity along with a prominent elongated quadrate are notable basicranial elements. Overall, Proganochelys is characterized by having relatively few chelonian features and having a relatively generalized amniote skull. The skull of Proganochelys quenstedtii from Trossingen, West Germany, retains a number of well-known amniote features not found in any other turtle. For instance, the lacrimal bone, supratemporal bone, and lacrimal duct are notable structures that are kept. Furthermore, some traits that are present in modern turtles are not present in Proganochelys and therefore must have come after the evolution of the shell. For instance, jaw differentiation, the fusion of the vomer, and the loss of the lacrimal are clear examples of traits that evolved after the evolution of the shell in Proganochelys.

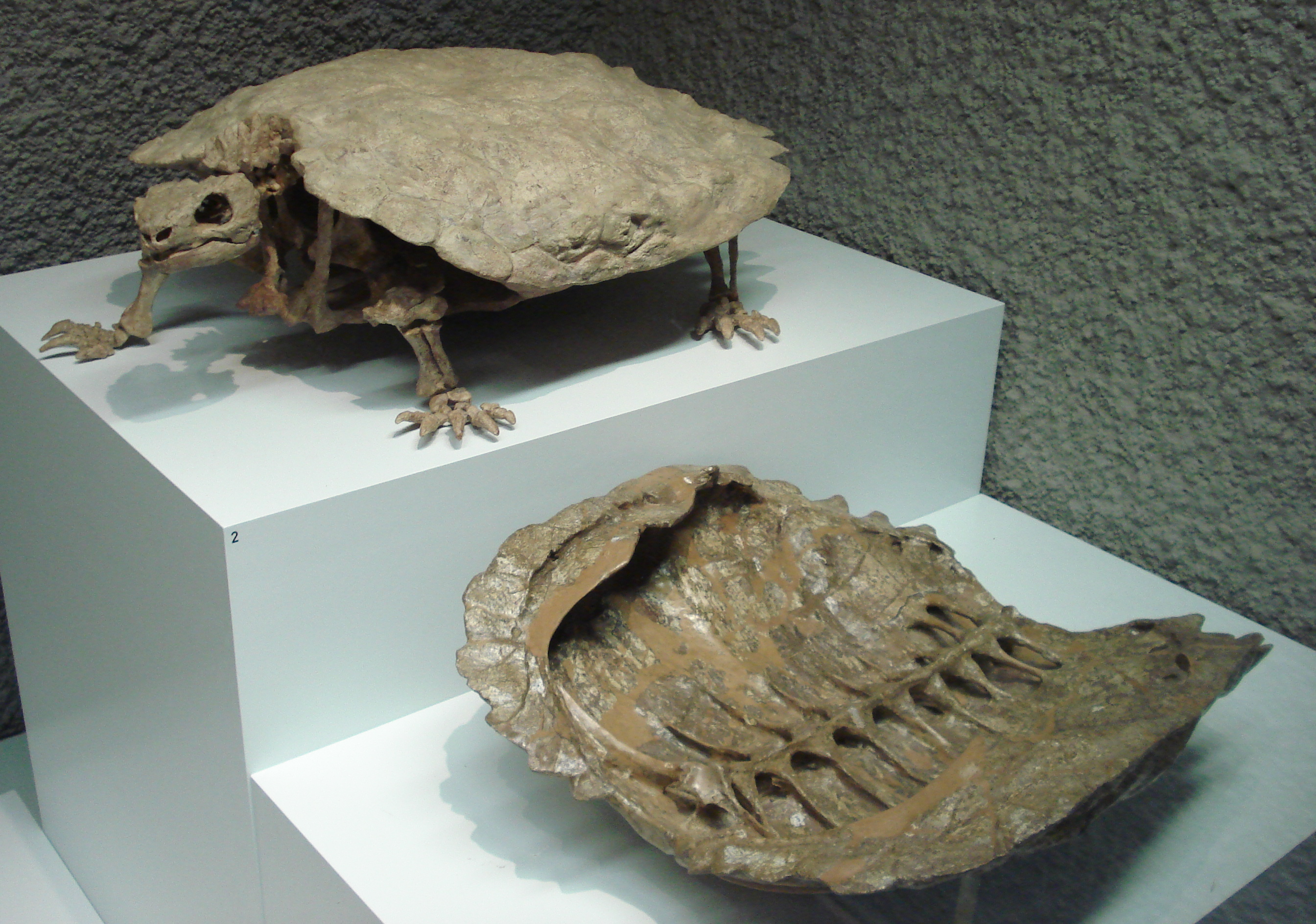
Proganochelys hard skeleton

=== Discovery ===
The earliest fossils of Proganochelys were discovered in Germany in the rural towns of Halberstadt, Tübingen, and Trossingen. The fossils were found in an elaborate formation of shales, sandstones, and some limestone piles, with the formation believed to be between 220 and 205 million years old. Consensus among Geologists placed the fossils in the middle of the Norian, around 210 million years ago, although this is largely an estimate. In addition to Proganochelys, the rock formations in Germany have also given fossils for the stem-turtle Proterochersis. Fossils have also been found the Klettgau Formation of Switzerland.

== Paleoecology ==
The specific ecology of the Late Triassic stem-turtles has been a major point of disagreement for many years among scientists. Triassic stem-turtles, including Proganochelys, appear to have been both aquatic and terrestrial. Shell proportions are believed to be correlated to the environment in which a turtle lives in, seen in modern turtles today. Using this concept, scientists were able to infer on the habitat in which Proganochelys may have lived in. A comparison between modern turtles and Proganochelys found that it was not likely that stem-turtles had differentiated into specialized ecologies such as open water swimmers or solely terrestrial turtles in the Late Triassic period. If this is the case, a freshwater habitat would be the most likely environment for Proganochelys to have lived in. On the other hand, it is noted that some believe Proganochelys were solely terrestrial. Shell bone histology of extant turtles revealed congruence with terrestrial turtles for the earliest basal turtles, including Proganochelys, in one study. The common ancestry of all living turtles is believed to be aquatic, while the earliest turtles are believed to have lived in a terrestrial environment.

=== Environment and forelimbs ===
Forelimbs are believed to be a physical feature that reflects the preferences and adaptations to a specific environment, indicating the environment a turtle would be most likely to reside in. Based on morphological data, Proganochelys is believed to have lived in a semi-aquatic environment, though a 2021 study groups it with tortoises and other terrestrial taxa. Turtles possessing short hands are believed to be most likely terrestrial, while turtles with long limbs are more likely to be aquatic. The majority of all testudines are short-handed and terrestrial, while all cheloniods are long-handed and aquatic. A study on its shell anatomy further conforms to a semi-aquatic mode of life.

== Classification ==
Proganochelys belongs to the group Testudinata, which consists of all extant turtles and several taxa of extinct kin. It is the oldest primitive stem turtle. The group does not include Odontochelys.

The cladogram below follows an analysis by Jérémy Anquetin (2012).

- - Odontochelys
  - Testudinata
    - †Proterochersis
    - †Proganochelys
    - - †Palaeochersis
      - †Australochelys
      - - †Kayentachelys
        - †Indochelys
        - †Sichuanchelys
        - †Chengyuchelys
        - †Chuannanchelys
        - †Eileanchelys
        - - †Heckerochelys
          - †Condorchelys
          - - - †Naomichelys
              - †Otwayemys
              - - †Mongolochelys
                - Meiolaniidae
                  - †Niolamia
                  - - †Ninjemys
                    - †Meiolania
            - - †Kallokibotion
              - Testudines (modern turtles)
