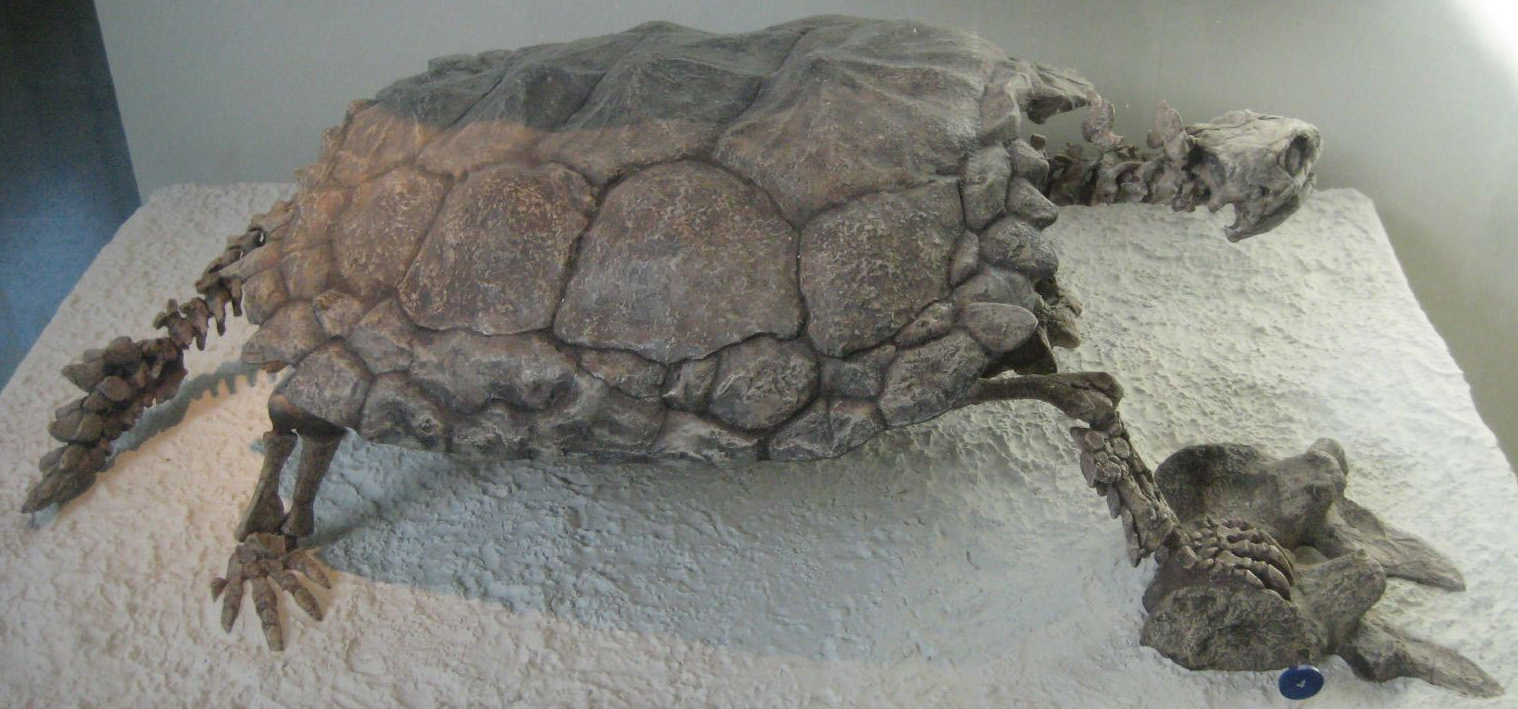
- Reconstructed skeleton of Proganochelys quenstedti, American Museum of Natural History
- Life restoration of Thaichelys, a proterochersid

Scientific classification
- Kingdom: Animalia
- Phylum: Chordata
- Class: Reptilia
- Clade: Pantestudines
- Clade: Testudinata; Klein, 1760

Subgroups
- †Priscochelys?; †Australochelyidae Gaffney & Kitching, 1994; †Australochelys; †Palaeochersis; †Waluchelys; †Proganochelyidae Hay, 1908; †Proganochelys; †Ypomonetikochelys; †Proterochersidae Nopcsa, 1923; †Bartassochersis; †Chinlechelys; †Cryptochersis; †Keuperotesta; †Proterochersis; †Thaichelys; Mesochelydia

= Testudinata =

Testudinata Temporal range: Late Triassic–Holocene (Norian–recent) Possible Early and Middle Triassic records

Clade of reptiles

Testudinata is the group of all tetrapods with a true turtle shell. It includes both modern turtles (Testudines) and many of their extinct, shelled relatives (stem-turtles). This excludes Pappochelys, Eorhynchochelys, and Odontochelys, which are placed in earlier-diverging positions within the more inclusive clade Pantestudines.

== History ==
Testudinata was first coined as the group containing turtles by Jacob Theodor Klein in 1760. In 1832–1836, Thomas Bell wrote a book describing the Testudinata, which summarizes all the world's turtles, living and extinct, illustrated by forty plates by Jane S. Bell, James de Carle Sowerby and Edward Lear. It was first defined in the modern sense by Joyce and colleagues in 2004. While the ancestral condition for the clade is thought to be terrestrial, members of the subclade Mesochelydia, which contains almost all known testudinatans from the Jurassic onwards, are thought to be ancestrally aquatic.

== Classification ==
The cladogram below follows an analysis by Jérémy Anquetin in 2012.

- - †Odontochelys
  - Testudinata
    - †Proterochersis
    - †Proganochelys
    - - †Palaeochersis
      - †Australochelys
      - - †Kayentachelys
        - †Indochelys
        - †Sichuanchelys
        - †Chengyuchelys
        - †Chuannanchelys
        - †Eileanchelys
        - - †Heckerochelys
          - †Condorchelys
          - - - †Naomichelys
              - †Otwayemys
              - - †Mongolochelys
                - †Meiolaniidae
                  - †Niolamia
                  - - †Ninjemys
                    - †Meiolania
            - - †Kallokibotion
              - Testudines (modern turtles)
