= Cryptochersis =

Cryptochersis Temporal range: Norian

Scientific classification
- Kingdom: Animalia
- Phylum: Chordata
- Class: Reptilia
- Clade: Pantestudines
- Clade: Testudinata
- Family: †Proterochersidae
- Genus: †Cryptochersis
- Species: †C. paraxene

Binomial name
- †Cryptochersis paraxene Szczygielski and Dróżdż, 2026

Extinct genus of turtles

Cryptochersis is an extinct monotypic genus of proterochersid turtle that lived in Greenland during the Norian stage of the Late Triassic epoch.

== Etymology ==
The generic name Cryptochersis derives from the Greek words krŭptós and khérsĭs, meaning hidden and tortoise, respectively. The specific epithet of the type species, Cryptochersis paraxene, refers to the Greek word paraxene, meaning strange.
