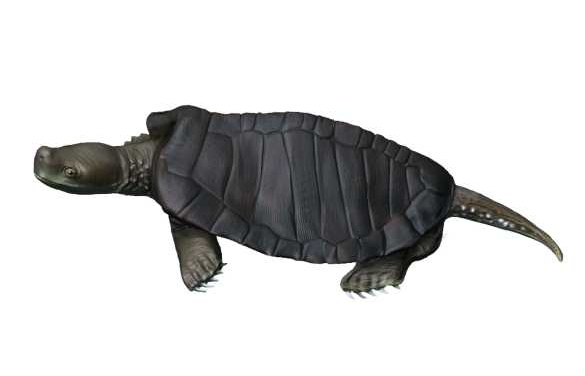
- Kayentachelys

Scientific classification
- Kingdom: Animalia
- Phylum: Chordata
- Class: Reptilia
- Clade: Pantestudines
- Clade: Testudinata
- Clade: Rhaptochelydia
- Clade: Mesochelydia; Joyce, 2017

Subgroupings
- †Condorchelys; †Eileanchelys; †Heckerochelys; †Indochelys; †Kayentachelys; Perichelydia

= Mesochelydia =

Mesochelydia Temporal range: Early Jurassic–Present

Clade of turtles

Mesochelydia (from Greek mesos "middle" and chelys "turtle") is a clade within Pantestudines, more inclusive than Perichelydia, but less than Testudinata. The clade is known from the Early Jurassic to the Present, and contains all Jurassic representatives of Testudinata aside from Australochelys. The ancestral condition for Mesochelydia is thought to be aquatic, as opposed to terrestrial for Testudinata. They are distinguished from more basal testudinatans by the presence of the following characters: strap like pectoral girdle, supramarginals absent, reduced posterior entoplastral process, eleven pairs of peripherals, elongate processus interfenestralis, paired basioccipital tubercles, fully formed cavum tympani and antrum postoticum, single vomer, confluent external nares, lacrimals and supratemporals absent.

== Taxonomy ==
- Condorchelys Sterli, 2008 Cañadón Asfalto Formation, Toarcian, Argentina
- Eileanchelys Anquetin et al. 2009 Kilmaluag Formation, Bathonian, Scotland
- Heckerochelys Sukhanov, 2006 Moskvoretskaya Formation, Bathonian, Russia
- Indochelys Datta et al., 2000 Kota Formation, Toarcian, India
- Kayentachelys Gaffney et al. 1987 Kayenta Formation, Sinemurian, United States
- Perichelydia Joyce, 2017 Middle Jurassic-Present, Worldwide

Additionally, an indeterminate basal non-perichelydian mesochelydian taxon is known from the Early Cretaceous Batylykh Formation in Russia.

Cladogram after Tong et al. 2022:

- Mesochelydia
  - †Kayentachelys
  - - †Condorchelys
    - - - †Heckerochelys
        - - †Eileanchelys
          - †Indochelys
      - Perichelydia
        - †Meiolaniidae
        - †Spoochelys
        - - †Sichuanchelyidae
          - †Chubutemys
          - - †Helochelydridae
            - - †Paracryptodira
              - †Compsemydidae
              - Crown group Testudines
                - - †Platychelyidae
                  - crown group Pleurodira (side-necked turtles)
                - - †Jurassichelon
                  - - †Solnhofia
                    - †Santanachelys
                    - - - †Portlandemys
                        - †Pleisochelys
                        - - - †Macrobaenidae
                            - †Xinjiangchelyidae
                          - crown group Cryptodira (hidden neck turtles, tortoises)
