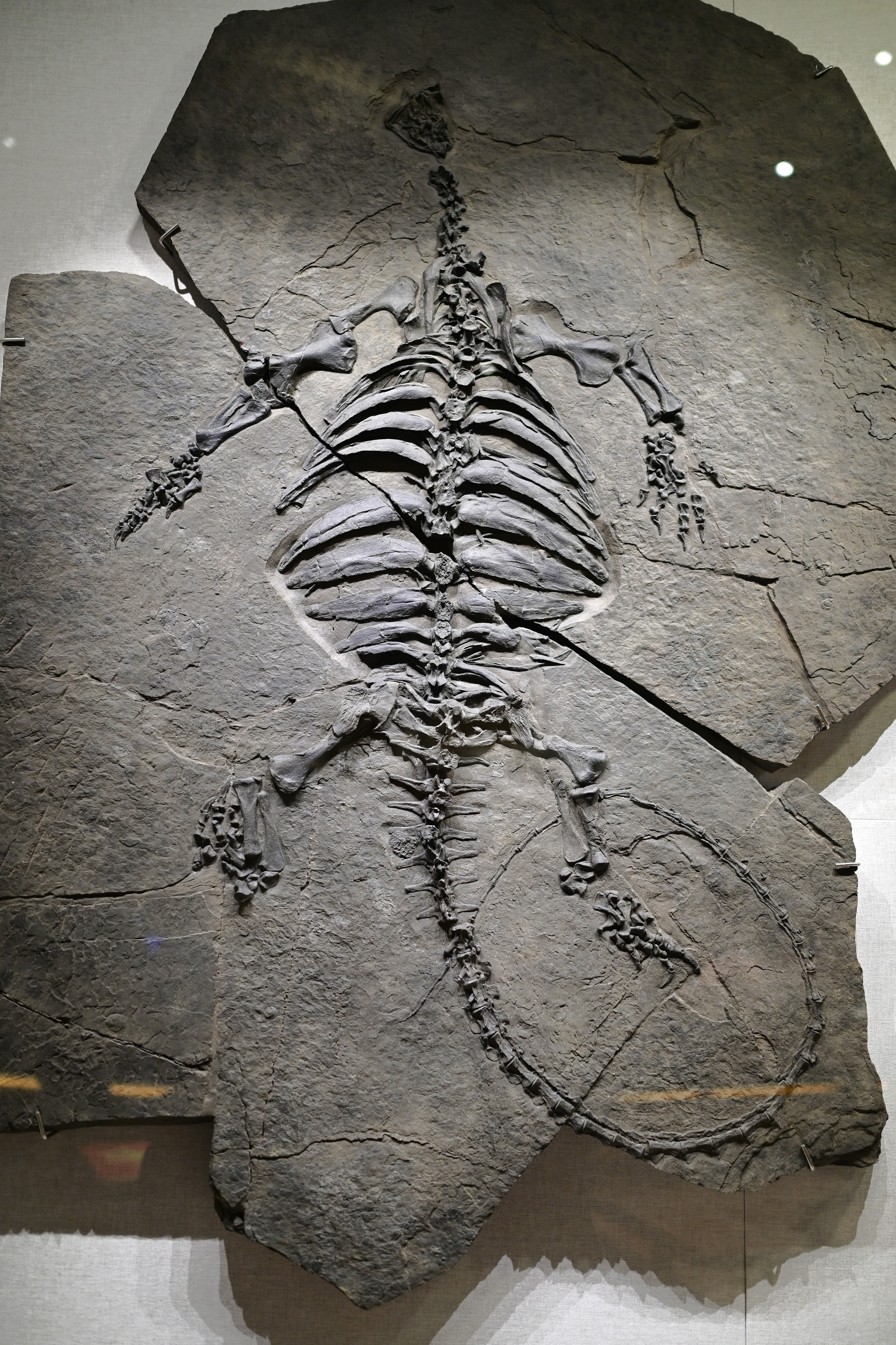
- Cast of holotype specimen (SMMP 000016), Baoding Natural History Museum

Scientific classification
- Kingdom: Animalia
- Phylum: Chordata
- Class: Reptilia
- Clade: Pantestudines
- Genus: †Eorhynchochelys; Li et al., 2018

Type species
- †Eorhynchochelys sinensis Li et al., 2018

= Eorhynchochelys =

Eorhynchochelys Temporal range: Late Triassic, 230 Ma

Extinct genus of turtles

Eorhynchochelys (meaning "dawn-beaked turtle" in Greek) is an extinct genus of stem-turtle from the Late Triassic Xiaowa Formation (or Wayao Member of the Falang Formation) of southwestern China.

== Description ==
Life restoration

Eorhynchochelys is notable for its unusual combination of a turtle-style skull and a conventional reptilian body. The skull, for example, has an edentulous beak typical of all members of Testudinata. However, the thorax region is markedly different Odontochelys and more similar to Pappochelys in lacking a shell, even though the ribs were wide and flat. The skull also has a single pair of holes behind the skull, unlike the presence of two pairs of holes in Pappochelys. Unlike other stem-turtles, Eorhynchochelys had twelve dorsal vertebrae. It reached up to 1.8 m (5.9 ft) in total length, which is much larger than Pappochelys.
