= Thaichelys =

Thaichelys Temporal range: Late Triassic, Norian
- Life reconstruction

Scientific classification
- Kingdom: Animalia
- Phylum: Chordata
- Class: Reptilia
- Clade: Pantestudines
- Clade: Testudinata
- Family: †Proterochersidae
- Genus: †Thaichelys; Szczygielski et al, 2025
- Species: †T. ruchae

Binomial name
- †Thaichelys ruchae (Broin, 1984)

Synonyms
- Proganochelys ruchae Broin, 1984

Extinct genus of turtles

Thaichelys (meaning "Thai turtle") is a genus of extinct proterochersid stem-turtle from the Late Triassic Huai Hin Lat Formation of Thailand. The type species is T. ruchae and it was initially classified as a species of Proganochelys.

== Discovery and naming ==
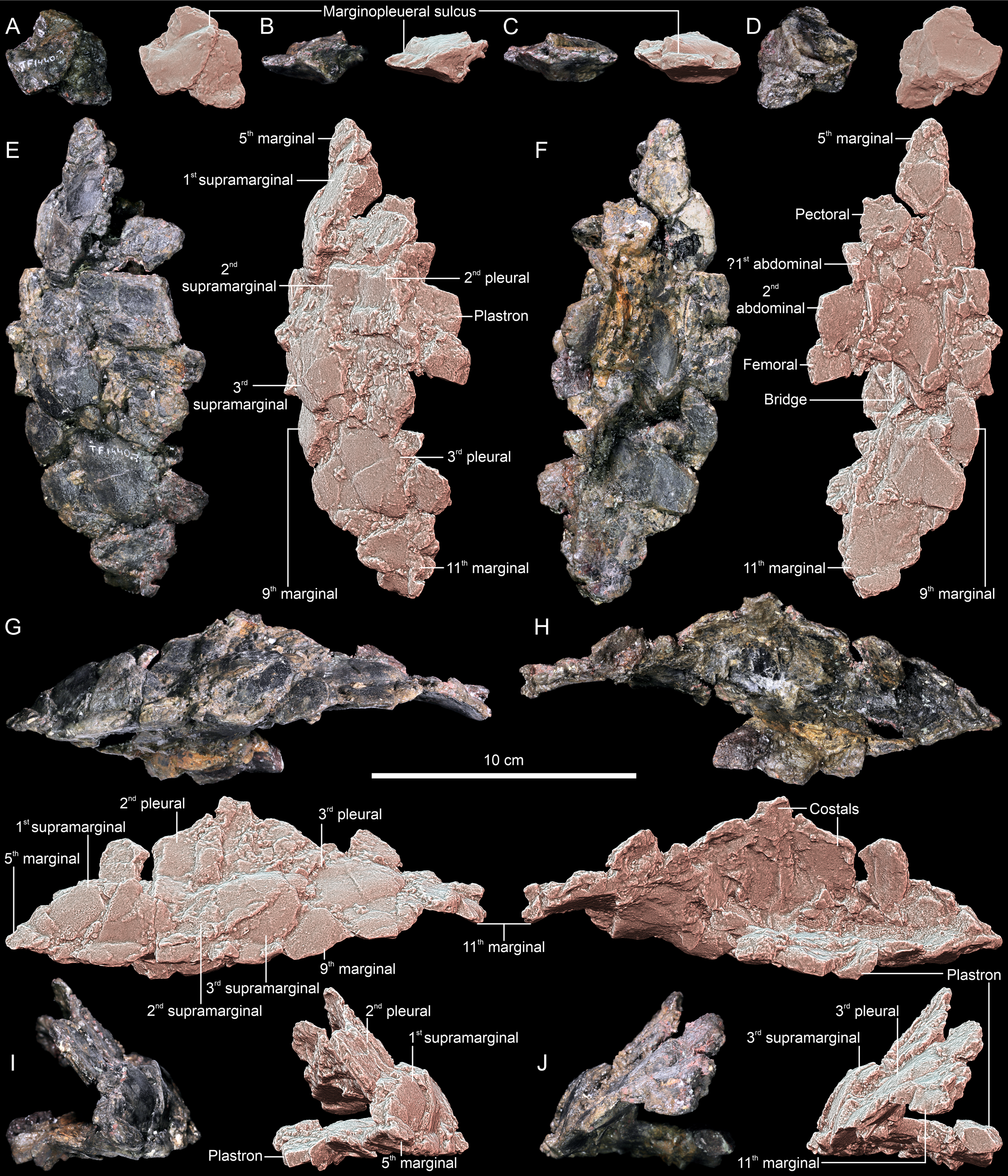
Carapace fragments from specimen SM2017-1-124

The first discovered remains referable to Thaichelys were discovered in 1980 along the road from Ban Huai Sanan Sai to Na Pha Song. The remains were initially described as Testudines indet. by de Lapparent de Broin et al. (1982) before being referred to "Proganochelys" ruchae (now Thaichelys ruchae) in 1984. The specimens have since become lost, but casts exist of all but one of the specimens in the French National Museum of Natural History.

In 1981, additional specimens listed as SM2015-1-001 (the holotype) and SM2017-1-124–SM2017-1-136 were discovered. They were recovered from the exposed surface limestones of the Huai Hin Lat Formation, Ban Suan Sawan Banana Farm, Si Chomphu district and were identified as belonging to a new species of Proganochelys (P. ruchae) by Broin (1984).

In 2025, the specimens of "Proganochelys" ruchae were studied again and it was determined that they belonged to a new genus, which was named Thaichelys.
