= Ypomonetikochelys =

Ypomonetikochelys Temporal range: Norian

Scientific classification
- Kingdom: Animalia
- Phylum: Chordata
- Class: Reptilia
- Clade: Pantestudines
- Clade: Testudinata
- Family: †Proganochelyidae
- Genus: †Ypomonetikochelys
- Species: †Y. euryaspis

Binomial name
- †Ypomonetikochelys euryaspis Szczygielski and Dróżdż, 2026

Extinct genus of turtle

Ypomonetikochelys is an extinct monotypic genus of proganochelyid turtle that inhabited Greenland during the Norian stage of the Late Triassic epoch.

== Etymology ==
The generic name Ypomonetikochelys derives from the Greek words ypomonetikós and khélūs, meaning patient and tortoise, respectively. The specific epithet of the type species, Ypomonetikochelys euryaspis, consists of the Greek words eurus, meaning wide, and aspis, meaning shield.
