= Waluchelys =

Waluchelys Temporal range: Late Triassic

Scientific classification
- Kingdom: Animalia
- Phylum: Chordata
- Class: Reptilia
- Clade: Pantestudines
- Clade: Testudinata
- Family: †Australochelyidae
- Genus: †Waluchelys; Sterli et al., 2020
- Species: †W. cavitesta

Binomial name
- †Waluchelys cavitesta Sterli et al., 2020

Extinct genus of reptile

Waluchelys is an extinct genus of australochelyid that lived during the Late Triassic epoch. It is known from a single species, Waluchelys cavitesta.
