= Condorchelys =

Condorchelys Temporal range: Middle Toarcian ~179.17–178.07 Ma

Scientific classification
- Kingdom: Animalia
- Phylum: Chordata
- Class: Reptilia
- Clade: Pantestudines
- Clade: Testudinata
- Clade: Rhaptochelydia
- Clade: Mesochelydia
- Genus: †Condorchelys; Sterli 2008
- Species: †C. antiqua

Binomial name
- †Condorchelys antiqua Sterli 2008

Extinct genus of turtles

Condorchelys was a genus of stem turtle from Early Jurassic (Middle Toarcian) Cañadon Asfalto Formation of Argentina. Condorchelys represents the oldest Jurassic-aged Turtle from South America, with only one species described, Condorchelys antiqua.

== Discovery ==
The holotype of Condorchelys was first discovered on the "Queso Rallado" locality, 5.5 km from the west of Cerro Cóndor village in the Chubut Province, Argentina, from layers of the Cañadón Asfalto Formation, back then considered to be Middle or Late Jurassic in age, though modern re-datations confirmed a Toarcian (Early Jurassic) Age. The holotype, MPEF-PV1152 is a basicranium. Other specimens where originally referred, including MPEF-PV 1783A-B (neural series, costal bones and thoracic vertebrae), MPEF-PV 1998 (basicranium), MPEF-PV 3131 (basicranium with skull roof), MPEF-PV 3132 (lmost complete carapace), MPEF-PV 3133 (pectoral girdle), MPEF-PV 3134 (entoplastron), MPEF-PV 3135 (pelvic girdle) and MPEF-PV 3136 (left hyoplastron). Additional specimens where later recovered in Queso Rallado, including both cranial and postcranial remains. And then in other outcrops like Cañadon Bagual, "Chucrut" and "Canela". The name was coined in reference to nearby Cerro Cóndor village, while the species name antiqua from the Latin word for old, ancient.

== Description ==
Condorchelys is overall similar to the genera Kayentachelys aprix and Indochelys spatulata, yet lacking pterygoid teeth and a V-shaped suprapygal 2. The skull roof exhibits ornamentation formed by ridges and grooves similar to the ones seen in Kayentachelys. The carapace is oval, about 21x16 cm in one of the referred specimens, being longer than wider, ornamented with small pits and grooves. Shell microstructure, showing bones with a low degree of compactness/homogenization of cortical and cancellous shell areas, suggests an aquatic life style.

== Phylogeny ==
The original description cladistic analysis allocated C. antiqua as a stem turtle, reinforcing previous placements of other stem taxa, including Kayentachelys, Indochelys & Condorchelys as a group, and the Middle Jurassic Laurasian genus Heckerochelys as a close outgrup. Latter on the basis of new material several phylogenetic analyses where done, finding C. antiqua either a stem member of Testudines or in several positions in Mesochelydia, in any case still grouping with Kayentachelys & Indochelys.
