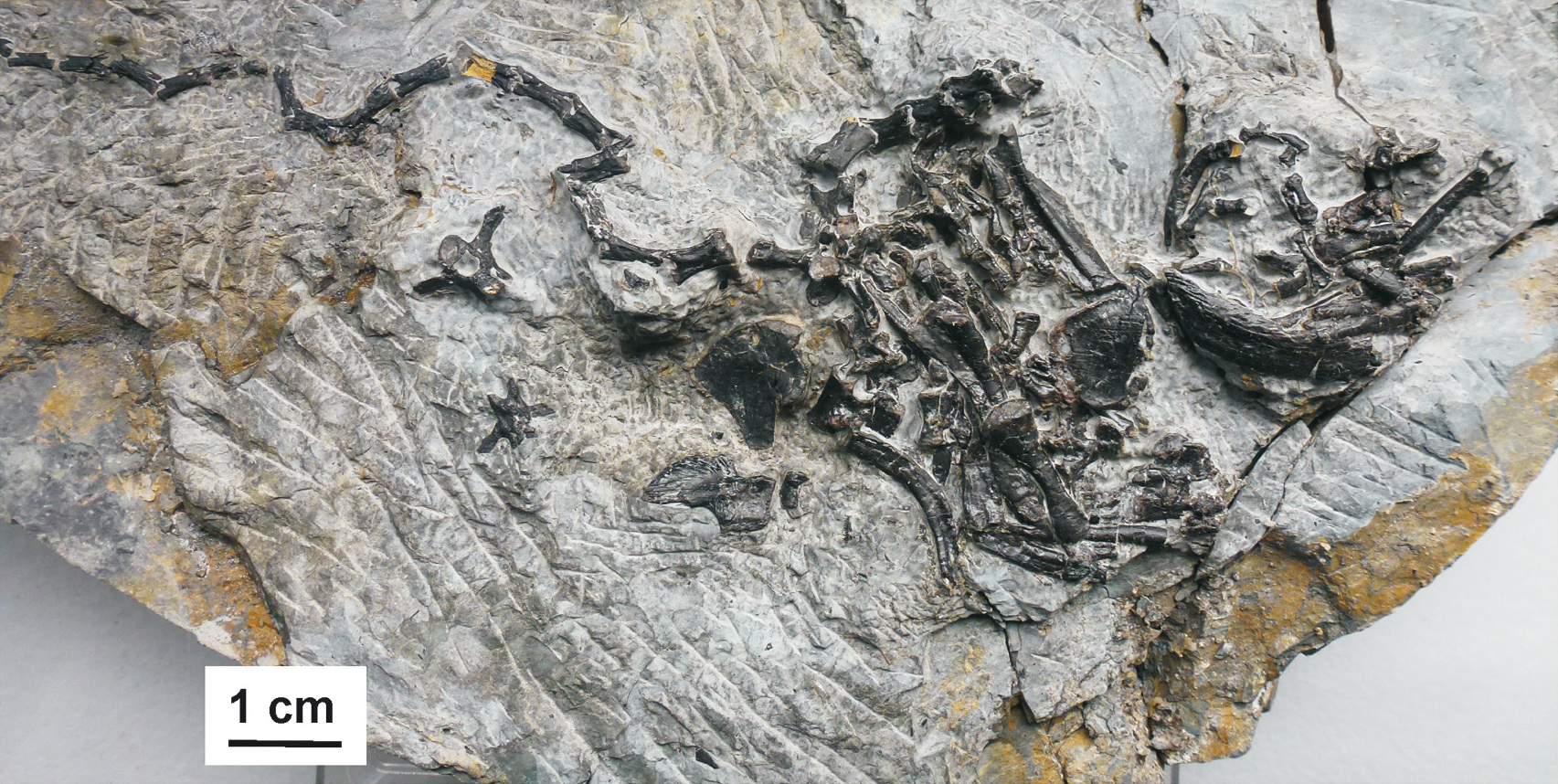
- The holotype specimen of Pappochelys
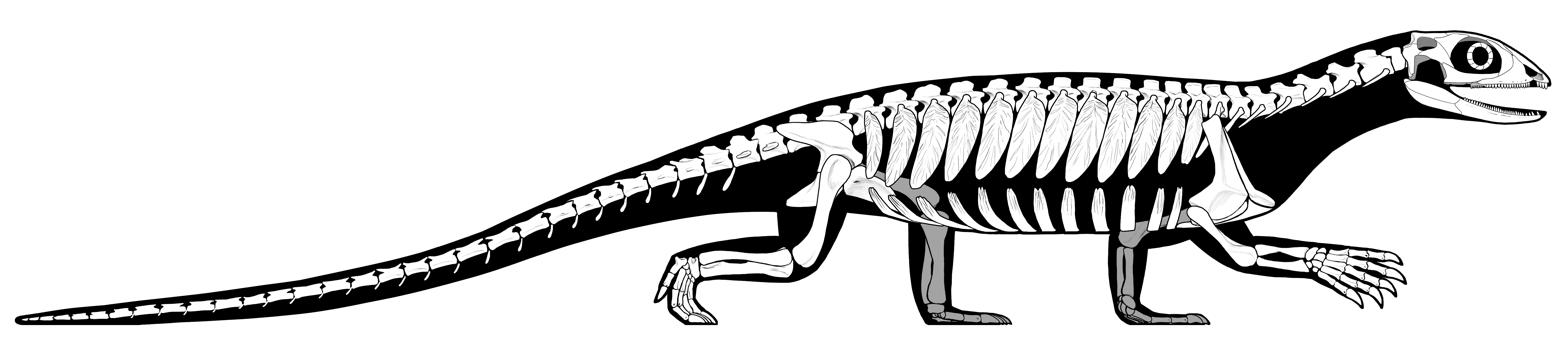
- Skeletal reconstruction from Jenkins et al., 2026

Scientific classification
- Kingdom: Animalia
- Phylum: Chordata
- Class: Reptilia
- Clade: Pantestudines
- Genus: †Pappochelys; Schoch & Sues 2015

Type species
- †Pappochelys rosinae Schoch & Sues 2015

= Pappochelys =

Pappochelys Temporal range: Middle Triassic, 240 Ma

Extinct genus of reptiles

Pappochelys (παπποχέλυς [πάππος (grandfather) + χέλυς (turtle)] meaning "grandfather turtle" in Greek) is an extinct genus of diapsid reptile possibly related to turtles. The genus contains only one species, Pappochelys rosinae, from the Middle Triassic of Germany, which was named by paleontologists Rainer Schoch and Hans-Dieter Sues in 2015. The discovery of Pappochelys provides strong support for the placement of turtles within Diapsida, a hypothesis that had been long suggested by molecular data. Pappochelys lacks a carapace and plastron but is important in showing broad, non-overlapping dorsal ribs - the first step in the evolution of the turtle shell

== Description ==
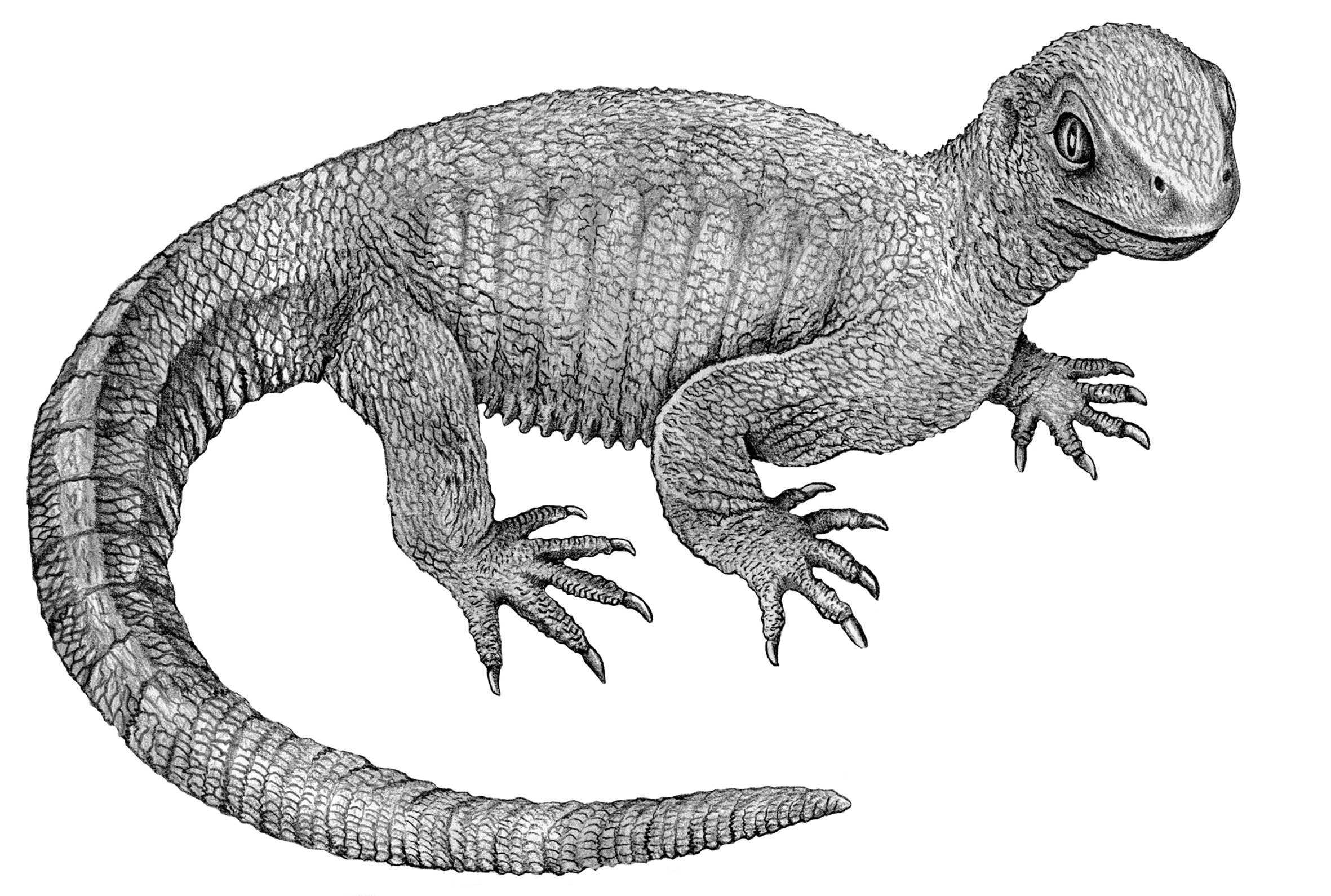
Life restoration

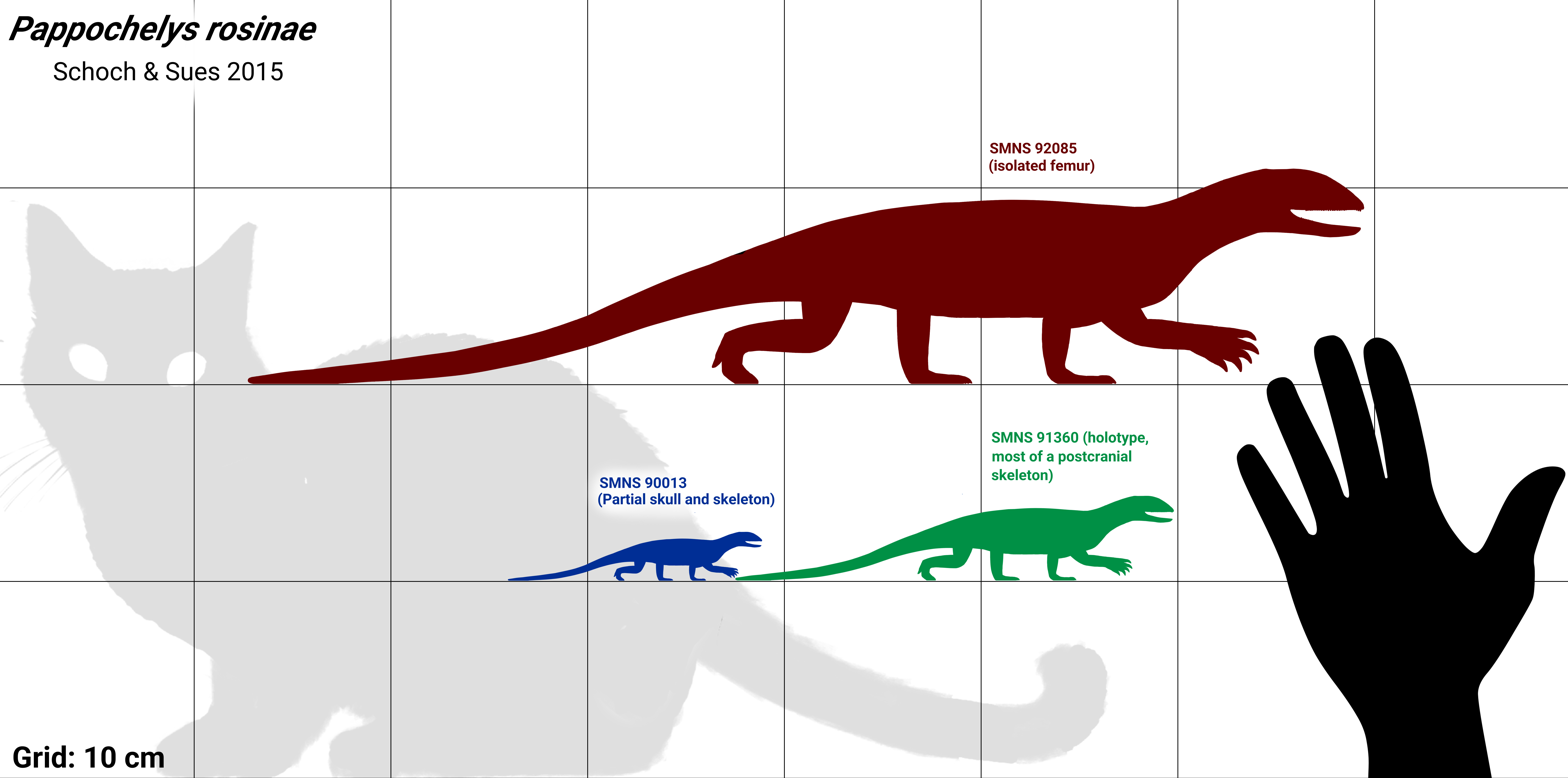
Size comparison of different specimens

Pappochelys had a wide body, small skull, and a long tail that makes up about half of the total body length, which is up to 20 centimetres (8 in). The skull is pointed with large eye sockets. Several turtle-like features are present, including expanded ribs and gastralia that seem to be precursors of a shell. Each rib is flattened into a broad blade-like structure with bumps and ridges covering its outer surface and a ridge running down its inner surface, forming a T-shape in cross section. The gastralia (rib-like bones covering the abdomen) are tightly packed and occasionally fused together, forming a structure similar to the plastron of turtles. Unlike turtles, Pappochelys has teeth in its jaws and two pairs of holes in the back of the skull called temporal fenestrae. The presence of two pairs of fenestrae make the skull of Pappochelys diapsid, as opposed to the anapsid skulls of turtles that lack any temporal fenestrae.

== Discovery ==
Fossils of Pappochelys come from a rock group in Germany called the Lower Keuper, which dates to the Ladinian stage of the Middle Triassic, approximately 240 million years ago (Ma), and are restricted to a 5 to 15 centimetres (2 to 6 in) layer of organic-rich claystone in an outcrop of the Erfurt Formation in the town of Vellberg. Paleontologists have studied the Lower Keuper extensively since the early nineteenth century and the claystone layer has been subject to intensive fossil collecting since 1985, yet it was not until 2006 that the first fossils of Pappochelys were found. Since then, excavations by the Staatliches Museum für Naturkunde Stuttgart have uncovered 20 specimens of Pappochelys representing most of the skeleton.

== Relationship to turtles ==
The placement of turtles on the reptile evolutionary tree has been a point of contention in the past few decades because of a disagreement between morphological and molecular data. For nearly a century, and based on paleontological data alone, turtles were long thought to be a group of basal reptiles due to their anapsid skull lacking temporal openings. Therefore, turtles were thought to lie outside the main group of reptiles, Sauria, which includes all other living reptiles (lizards, snakes, crocodilians, and birds) and is characterized by two pairs of temporal openings, also known as the diapsid condition. In contrast, molecular data suggests that turtles lie within Sauria, either as a subset of the Lepidosauromorpha (which includes lizards and snakes)—supported by one microRNA analysis—or the clade Archosauromorpha (which includes crocodilians and birds)—supported by almost all molecular analyses, studies focusing on soft tissue structures, and recent paleontological phylogenetic analyses.

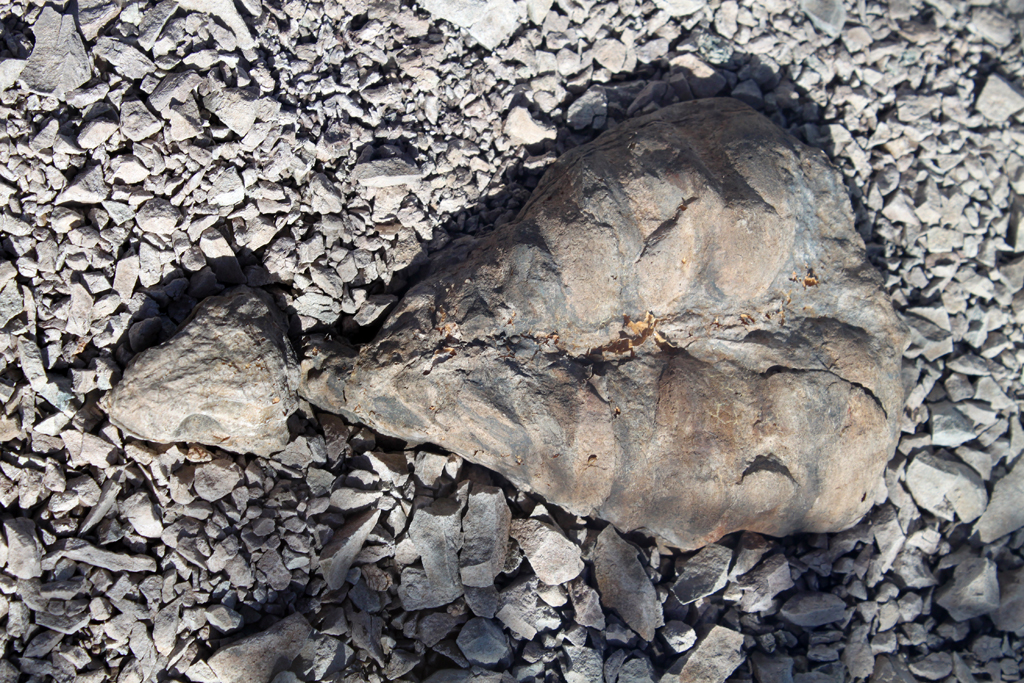
Fossil of Eunotosaurus, a millerettid stem reptile with ribs superficially similar to Pappochelys (although in Pappochelys, the ribs do not overlap).

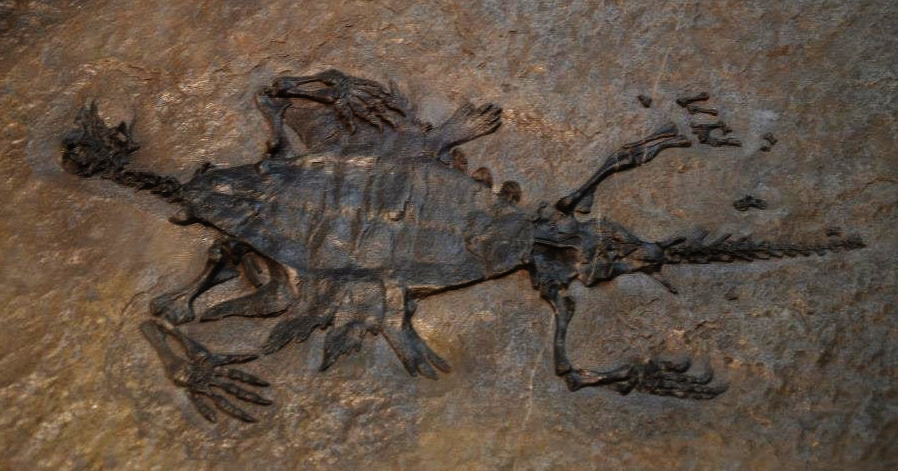
Fossil of Odontochelys, a reptile more closely related to turtles than Pappochelys

The discovery of Pappochelys, the first stem turtle bearing two temporal fenestra, provided the first strong evidence from the fossil record that turtles were ancestrally diapsid. In 2015, Schoch and Sues incorporated Pappochelys and other stem turtles into a phylogenetic analysis along with stem reptiles, turtles, and many other reptilian taxa to elucidate their relationships. Their analysis found support for a diapsid clade containing Eunotosaurus, Pappochelys, Odontochelys, and turtles (although these authors later had reservations about the pantestudine identity of Eunotosaurus, and several authors have found Eunotosaurus as a millerettid stem-reptile not closely related to Pantestudines), and placed turtles within Lepidosauromorpha, conflicting with molecular-based studies that generally found a relationship between turtles and archosaurs. Below is a cladogram or evolutionary tree showing the results of their analysis, with stem-turtles denoted by the green bracket:

- - Seymouriidae
  - - Diadectomorpha
    - Amniota
      - Synapsida
      - Sauropsida (reptiles)
        - Parareptilia
        - - Captorhinidae
          - - Paleothyris
            - Diapsida
              - Araeoscelida
              - - Claudiosaurus
                - - Younginiformes
                  - - Archosauromorpha
                      (archosaurs: crocodilians, birds, and relatives)
                    - Lepidosauromorpha
                      - - Kuehneosauridae
                        - - Rhynchocephalia
                          - Squamata
                            (lizards and snakes)
                      - Pantestudines
                        - Sauropterygia
                        - - Eunotosaurus
                          - - Pappochelys
                            - - Odontochelys
                              - Testudines
                                (turtles)

In their description of Chinlechelys, Lichtig & Lucas (2021) criticized Schoch & Sue's hypothesis of turtle origins, particularly the idea shells evolved from broadening ribs with no osteoderms involved (as Pappochelys apparently indicates). Instead, they proposed Pappochelys was actually a sauropterygian related to placodonts while turtles were pareiasaurs. New data on the braincase of Proganochelys has shown that turtles were not only anatomically diapsid (as shown by Pappochelys), but that the cranial anatomy of early turtles were remarkably archosauromorph-like.

== Paleobiology ==
The claystone bed in which fossils of Pappochelys were found was likely deposited in a lake setting, suggesting that Pappochelys may have been semi-aquatic like modern turtles. Although Pappochelys lacked a fully formed shell like modern turtles, its thickened bones may have helped reduce the body's buoyancy, making it a more adept swimmer. However, otherwise the anatomy has no signs of a fully aquatic lifestyle and only few adaptations for swimming. In addition, a histological study found that its limb bones had a thick outer wall and small, open (rather than spongy) medullary cavity, like only a few aquatic reptiles and completely unlike modern aquatic turtles, but consistent with amphibious taxa. These features have also been recorded in terrestrial reptiles such as the modern lizard Sceloporus and fossil stem reptiles such as Eunotosaurus. This may indicate that Pappochelys had an amphibious lifestyle, rather than a fully aquatic one.
