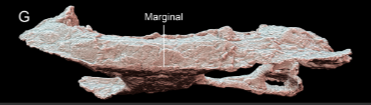
- Carapace from the holotype

Scientific classification
- Kingdom: Animalia
- Phylum: Chordata
- Class: Reptilia
- Clade: Pantestudines
- Clade: Testudinata
- Clade: Rhaptochelydia
- Family: †Australochelyidae
- Genus: †Palaeochersis; Rougier, de la Fuente & Arcucci, 1995
- Species: †P. talampayensis

Binomial name
- †Palaeochersis talampayensis Rougier, de la Fuente & Arcucci, 1995

= Palaeochersis =

Palaeochersis Temporal range: Late Triassic, ~227–213 Ma

Extinct genus of turtles

Palaeochersis is an extinct genus of rhaptochelydian turtle from the Los Colorados Formation of Argentina. It is known from one species, Palaeochersis talampayensis.

== Discovery and naming ==
Palaeochersis talampayensis is known from three specimens: PULR 68 (holotype), a skull and postcranium. PULR 69, a right tarsus and pes, and PULR 72, a skull. The three specimens were each collected together in 1992 within the Los Colorados Formation, Argentina.

Palaeochersis talampayensis was then named and described by Rougier, de la Fuente & Arcucci (1995).

== Classification ==
Palaeochersis was part of the Australochelyidae, being the sister taxon to Australochelys.
