= Kayentachelys =

Kayentachelys Temporal range: Early Jurassic 196.5–183.0 Ma

Scientific classification
- Kingdom: Animalia
- Phylum: Chordata
- Class: Reptilia
- Clade: Pantestudines
- Clade: Testudinata
- Clade: Mesochelydia
- Genus: †Kayentachelys; Gaffney et al., 1987
- Species: †K. aprix

Binomial name
- †Kayentachelys aprix Gaffney et al., 1987

Extinct genus of turtles

Kayentachelys ("Kayenta turtle") is an extinct genus of turtle known only from the "silty facies" of the Lower Jurassic Kayenta Formation in northeastern Arizona on the lands of the Navajo Nation.

== History of discovery and significance ==
The earliest mention of turtles from the Kayenta Formation in the literature is within the description of the ornithischian dinosaur Scutellosaurus by Colbert (1981). These first specimens were collected during the 1970s and early 1980s by field parties from the Museum of Northern Arizona (MNA) and the Museum of Comparative Zoology (MCZ) at Harvard University. Specimens from these field excursions were used to establish the taxon Kayentachelys in 1987, and it is an MNA specimen (MNA V1558) which was designated as the holotype of the taxon. During the early 1980s, addition turtle specimens from the Kayenta Formation were collected by field parties from the University of California Museum of Paleontology (UCMP), which were reported by Clark & Fastovsky (1986) prior to the naming of Kayentachelys. Many additional specimens of Kayentachelys were collected by the Texas Memorial Museum (TMM; now TxVP the Texas Vertebrate Paleontology Collections) at The University of Texas at Austin between 1997 and 2000. That work by the TMM remains the most recent large-scale collecting of vertebrate fossils from the Kayenta Formation in Arizona.

Kayentachelys is significant because it is the first truly abundant turtle in the fossil record, and its unique phylogenetic position documents the transition from early turtles to the common ancestor of the crown. Additionally, as of 2018, Kayentachelys is the most abundantly known vertebrate taxon from the Kayenta Formation.

== Diagnosis and description ==
Kayentachelys is known from several dozen specimens preserving elements from both the cranial and postcranial skeleton. Its shell is about 20 cm (7.9 in) in length.

As originally diagnosed, Kayentachelys possesses pterygoid teeth and a ventrally-exposed prootic, both of which are ancestral amniote features. Ancestral turtle features of the shell include nine costal scutes and an epiplastron with a dorsal process. Derived features shared with early turtles like Proterochersis and cryptodirans include an antrum postoticum of the squamosal, a fused basipterygoid articulation, and 11 peripheral osteoderms. Gaffney et al. united Kayentachelys with cryptodiran taxa based upon featured of the palate and braincase.

Sterli and Joyce (2007) emended the diagnosis of Kayentachelys using a unique combination of ancestral and derived cranial character states, including prefrontals which do not contact one another at the midline, the absence of lacrimals, frontals which contribute to the orbit, an unpaired vomer, pterygoid teeth, the absence of palatal teeth, and a retroarticular process, among many other features.

== Systematics ==
The genus Kayentachelys is monotypic, comprising only one species. The type species Kayentachelys aprix was defined based upon the holotype specimen MNA V1558 and the referred specimens MNA V1559-V1570 and MCZ 8914-8917. The specific epithet aprix (Greek: tight) refers to the fused basicranial articulation.

When Kayentachelys was first described by Gaffney et al. (1987), it was classified as the oldest and earliest branching cryptodiran turtle and the sole taxon within a new clade called Kayentachelyidae. Kayentachelys was noted to possess a unique combination of derived character states which united it with all cryptodiran turtles and ancestral character states which excluded it from a clade comprising all other cryptodiran taxa that the authors called Selmacryptodira. Below is a cladogram depicting the initial classification of Kayentachelys within Cryptodira by Gaffney et al. (1987):

- Testudines
  - †Proganochelys
  - - Casichelydia
      - Pleurodira
      - Cryptodira
        - †Kayentachelys
        - Selmacryptodira

In 2007, a competing hypothesis regarding the phylogeny of Kayentachelys arose. Sterli and Joyce (2007) Sterli and Joyce (2007) argued that Kayentachelys was not a member of Crytodira and instead represented an early testudinatan outside of Testudines. The placement of Kayentachelys outside of Cryptodira has been upheld by most subsequent phylogenetic analyses of early turtles.

Below is a cladogram depicting the phylogenetic hypothesis from Sterli and Joyce (2007):

- - †Proganochelys
  - - †Paleochersis
    - - †Proterochersis
      - - †Kayentachelys
        - - †Mongolochelys
          - - †Kallokibotion
            - - Panpleurodira
              - - †Paracryptodira
                - Eucryptodira

== Occurrence and geologic setting ==
Kayentachelys is known only from the "silty facies" of the Kayenta Formation in northeastern Arizona. The Kayenta Formation is a stratigraphic unit within the Triassic-Jurassic Glen Canyon Group, which crops out across the Colorado Plateau. Despite extensive outcrop of the "typical facies" of the Kayenta Formation in Utah, Colorado, and northern Arizona, vertebrate fossils are rare in these regions. Vertebrate fossils from the "silty facies" of the Kayenta Formation are most abundantly known from Ward Terrace along the Adeii Eechii Cliffs southeast of Tuba City, AZ on the lands of the Navajo Nation. In particular, specimens of Kayentachelys have been recovered near an area called Gold Spring, which has recently been dated to the Pliensbachian-Toarcian ages of the Early Jurassic Epoch based upon uranium-lead ages acquired using laser ablation inductively coupled mass spectrometry.

== Paleoecology ==
Kayentachelys was initially interpreted as an aquatic turtle, based upon the sharp tapered edges of the low-domed shell and the lack of both limb armor and sculpturing on the carapace.

Kayentachelys is one component of a diverse assemblage of vertebrate taxa preserved within the Kayenta Formation. Kayentachelys lived alongside hybodontoid chondrichthyans; the early anuran Prosalirus; the gymnophionan Eocaecilia; sphenodontid diapsids; several species of crocodylomorph, including Kayentasuchus, Eopneumatosuchus, Protosuchus, and the goniopholidid Calsoyasuchus; the pterosaur Rhamphinion; the sauropodomorph dinosaur Sarahsaurus; the theropod dinosaurs Dilophosaurus and "Syntarsus" kayentakatae; the ornithischian dinosaur Scutellosaurus; the tritylodontid synapsids Oligokyphus, Dinnebitodon, and Kayentatherium; the mammaliaform synapsid Dinnetherium; and several other yet-unnamed taxa.

The paleoenvironment of the Kayenta Formation in which Kayentachelys lived has been reconstructed as a floodplain drained by low-energy, sediment-rich streams. The presence of aquatic and moisture-reliant taxa including Kayentachelys, Prosalirus, and Eocaecilia indicates that water was likely abundant. This abundance of water is also supported by the presence of mudstones within "silty facies" the Kayenta Formation on Ward Terrace. Petrified wood is common in the Kayenta Formation on Ward Terrace, suggesting abundant gymnosperm plantlife.
