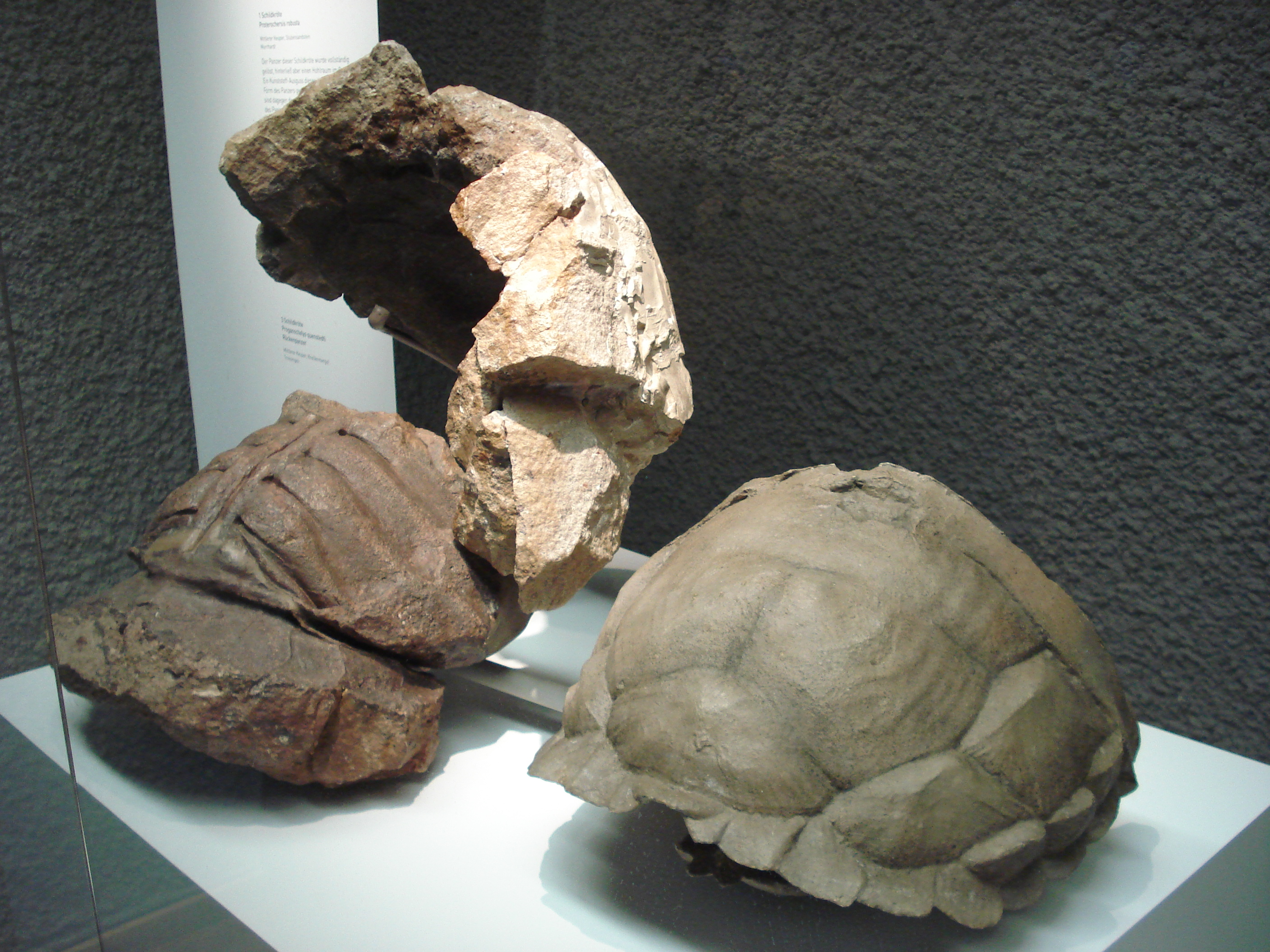
- Fossil remains of Proterochersis shell

Scientific classification
- Kingdom: Animalia
- Phylum: Chordata
- Class: Reptilia
- Clade: Pantestudines
- Clade: Testudinata
- Family: †Proterochersidae
- Genus: †Proterochersis; Fraas, 1913

Species
- †Proterochersis intermedia? Fraas, 1913; †Proterochersis limendorsa Szczygielski & Sulej, 2016; †Proterochersis porebensis Szczygielski & Sulej, 2016; †Proterochersis robusta Fraas, 1913

Synonyms
- Chelytherium obscurum Meyer, 1865; Proterochersis robustum Fraas, 1913 [sic]

= Proterochersis =

Proterochersis Temporal range: Late Triassic

Extinct genus of turtles

Proterochersis is an extinct genus of turtle from the Late Triassic period (Norian stage) of Europe. It is known from a large number of fossils uncovered in Germany and Poland. The genus was named from fossil remains from Germany in 1913 by Fraas, who recognized two species: P. robusta (type species) and P. intermedia. Since then, Szczygielski and Sulej have found that the differences described by Fraas could be the result of intraspecific variation, meaning that P. intermedia are synonymous with P. robusta. They also decided to classify more recent fossil findings from Poland as two new species, P. limendorsa and P. porebensis. A study from 2021 concluded that fossil turtle remains described in 1865 as Chelytherium obscurum are probably synonymous with Proterochersis. Generally, the rules of nomenclature advocate that the oldest taxonomic name should replace more recent ones, but Szczygielski choose to keep the name Proterochersis.

== Description ==
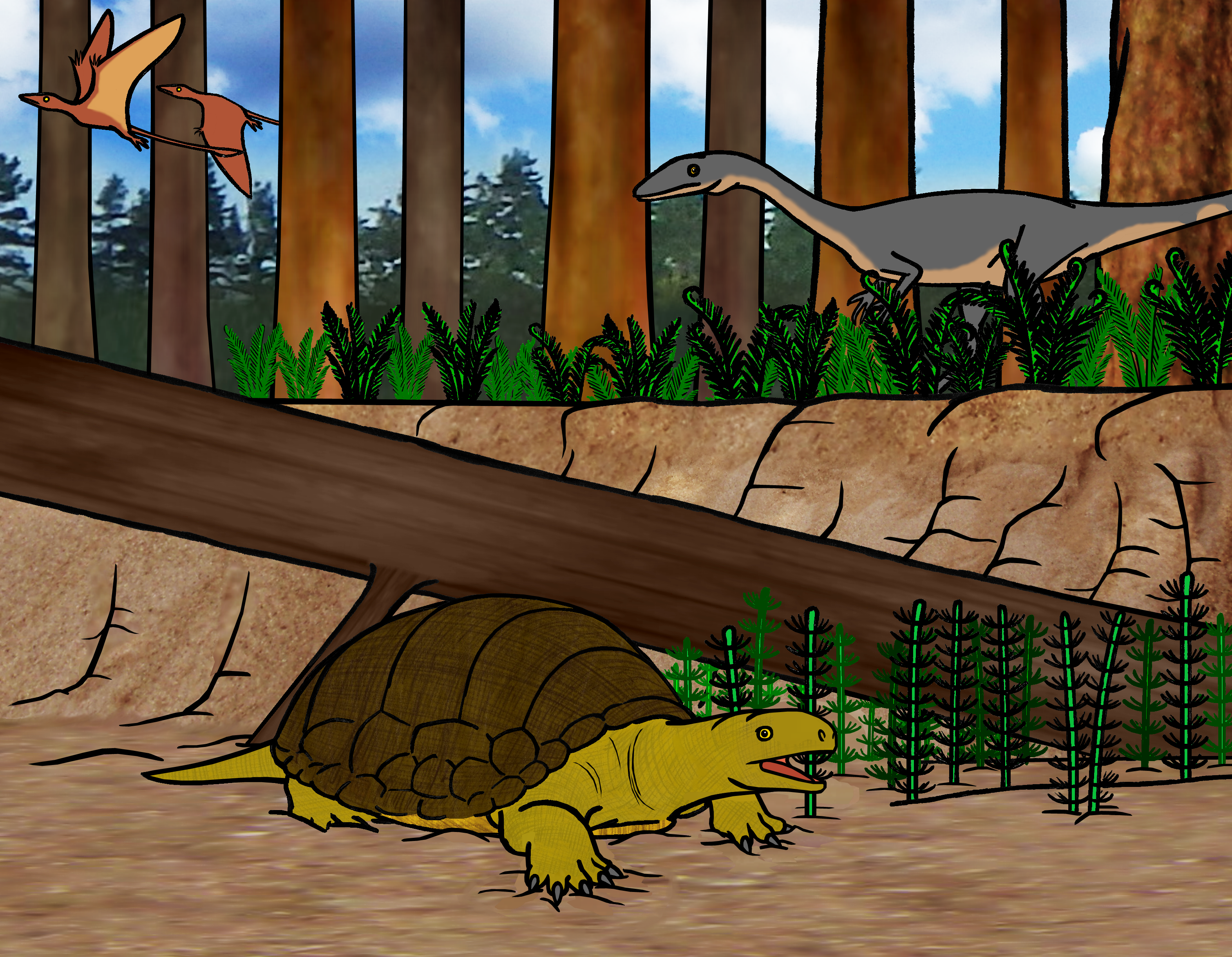
Artistic depiction of Proterochersis in Late Triassic habitat

Together with Proganochelys, Proterochersis is one of the earliest known Testudinata with a fully formed shell. Fossils show that Proterochersis was a turtle of moderate size, with a domed shell similar to modern tortoises. The shell reached a length of about 38.5–40 cm (15.2–15.7 in) in the largest known specimens. The shell also possesses a well developed caudal notch in the back end, indicating that Proterochesis might have possessed a fairly well developed tail, similar to modern snapping turtles.

== Phylogeny ==
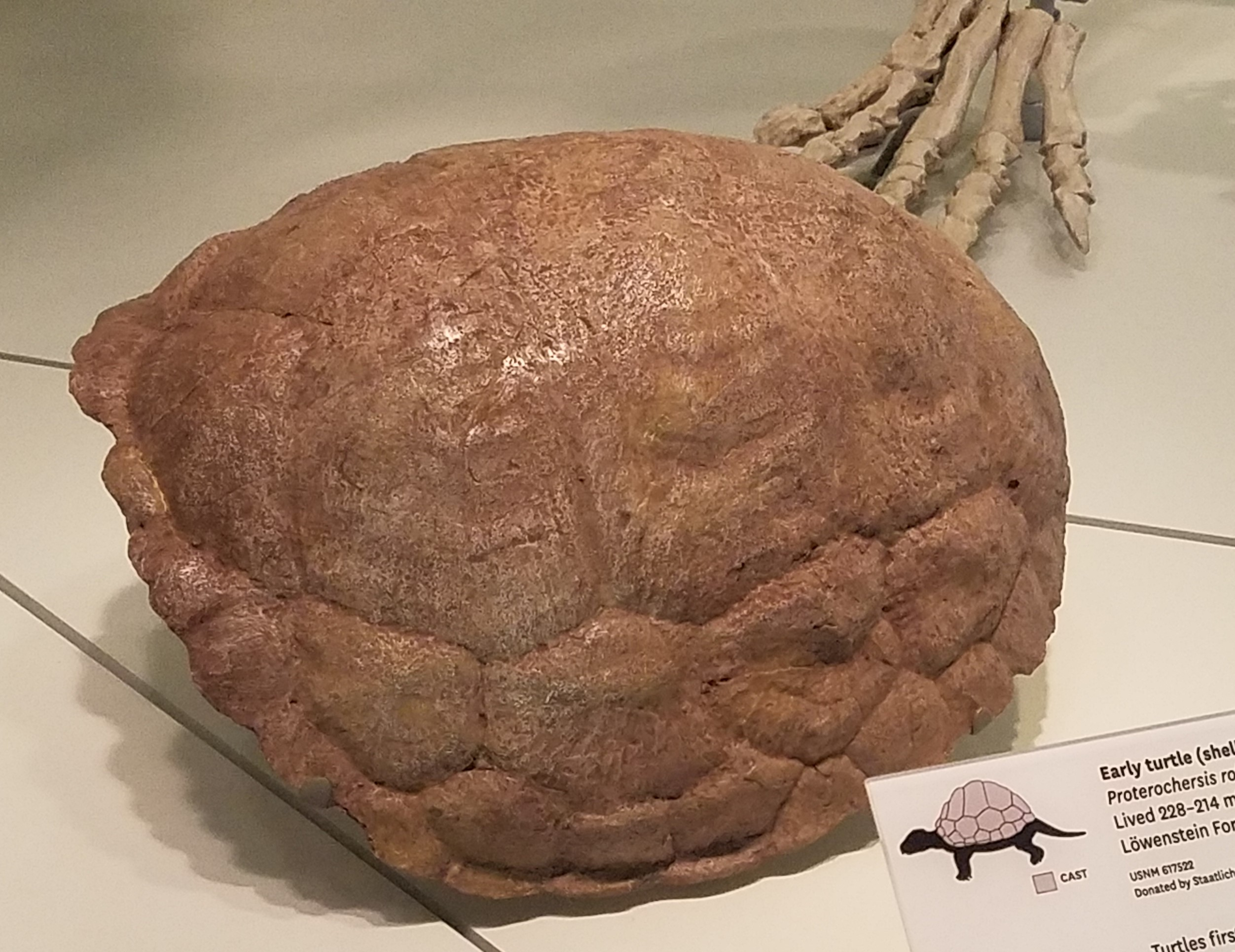
Shell cast of P. robusta

Proterochersis belongs to the Proterochersidae, which represent the oldest and most basal of all known shelled turtles (testudinatans). Some studies in the 2010s suggested that they belong to the crown-group of turtles, as Proterochersis possess several anatomical features in common with modern side-necked turtles (pleurodires). If Proterochersis were indeed a pleurodiran, this would mean that the crown-group of turtles originated in the Late Triassic period. More detailed research, however, concludes that the similarities with modern turtles are the result of convergent evolution and that the crown group of turtles dates back no further than to Middle Jurassic. Szczygielski and Sulej found Proterochersis to be more primitive than Proganochelys.

== Paleoecology ==
There are disagreement about the lifestyle of Proterochersis. while histological data have indicated a terrestrial lifestyle, other evidence suggest that it was aquatic.
