= Odontochelys =

Odontochelys Temporal range: Late Triassic, 220 Ma
- Holotype specimen

Scientific classification
- Kingdom: Animalia
- Phylum: Chordata
- Class: Reptilia
- Clade: Pantestudines
- Family: †Odontochelyidae; Li et al. 2008
- Genus: †Odontochelys; Li et al. 2008
- Species: †O. semitestacea

Binomial name
- †Odontochelys semitestacea Li et al. 2008

Extinct genus of reptiles

Odontochelys (meaning "toothed turtle") is an extinct genus of early pantestudine (stem-turtle) known from the Late Triassic of China. The genus contains a single species, Odontochelys semitestacea, which is the only member of the family Odontochelyidae. Before the discovery of Pappochelys (a Middle Triassic taxon from Germany), Odontochelys was considered the oldest undisputed pantestudine.

== Discovery ==
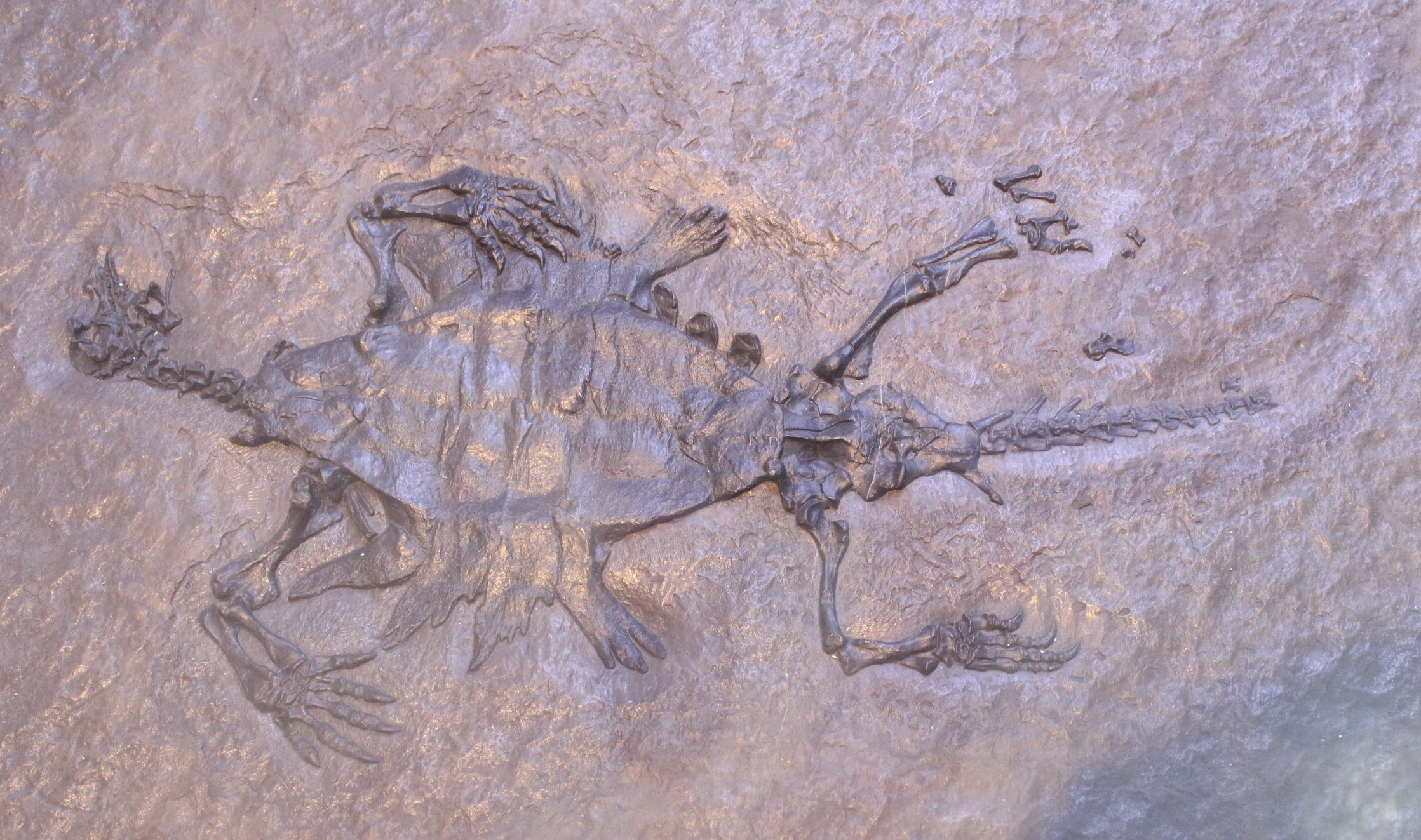
Cast of the paratype specimen (IVPP V 13240), Paleozoological Museum of China

Odontochelys semitestacea was first described from three 220-million-year-old specimens excavated in Triassic deposits in Guizhou, China. The locale of its discovery at one time was the Nanpanjiang Trough basin, a shallow marine environment surrounded on three sides by land. These deposits preserve an ecosystem known as the Guanling biota, which was dominated by marine reptiles.

== Description ==
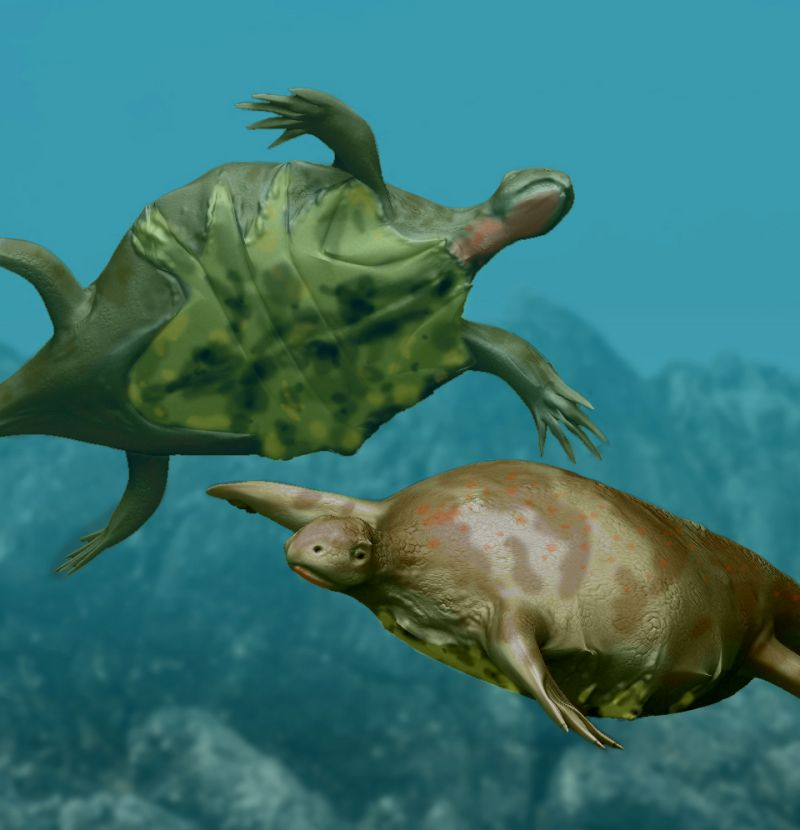
Life reconstruction as a marine reptile, a controversial ecological hypothesis

Odontochelys differed grossly from modern turtles. Modern turtles have a horny beak without teeth in their mouth. In contrast, Odontochelys fossils were found to have had teeth embedded in their upper and lower jaws. One of the most striking features of turtles, both modern and prehistoric alike, are their dorsal shells, forming an armored carapace over the body of the animal. Odontochelys only possessed the bottom portion of a turtle's armor, the plastron. It did not yet have a solid carapace as most other turtles do. Instead of a solid carapace, Odontochelys possessed broadened ribs like those of modern turtle embryos that still have not started developing the ossified plates of a carapace. It reached nearly 40 cm (16 in) in total body length.

Aside from the presence of teeth and the absence of a solid carapace, a few other skeletal traits distinguish Odontochelys as basal compared to other turtles, extant and otherwise. The point of articulation between the dorsal ribs and the vertebrae is decidedly different in Odontochelys than in later turtles. In a comparison of skull proportions, the skull of Odontochelys is far more elongated pre-orbitally (in front of the eyes) compared to other turtles. The tail of the prehistoric turtle was longer in proportion to its body than in other turtles. In addition, the transverse processes found in the tail are not fused such as in later turtles. Also, the scapulae of the examined specimens were identified as lacking acromion processes. Taken together, these anatomical differences have been interpreted by the discoverers to mean that Odontochelys has some of the most primitive features ever seen in a turtle and is somewhat of a transitional fossil.

Evidence that the plastron evolved before the carapace, as indicated by the lack of carapace in Odontochelys semitestacea, is often viewed as an indication of the aquatic origin of turtles. The fossil was found in marine deposits, further supporting that the primitive turtle frequented shallow marine water. Since it is generally accepted that the shell arose to provide protection against predators, the semi-aquatic nature of turtles and the development of the plastron complement each other. Ancestral turtles with protection on their underside are more protected from predators that attack from below. Based on this interpretation, the development of the carapace was likely driven in a land animal.

Reisz and Head (2008), however, have a different interpretation on the same specimen. Instead, they suggest that the carapace on O. semitestacea was in fact present; it just lacked ossification of some of its dermal components. With this interpretation, the authors suggest that either turtle shells originally evolved in aquatic environments, or this fossil represents the earliest turtle transferring from terrestrial environments to marine habitats.

== Paleoecology ==
Even though the Odontochelys specimens were found in marine deposits, there is uncertainty over whether it was a primarily aquatic reptile, in transition from aquatic to terrestrial habitats, or fully terrestrial. Li et al. (2008) argued that Odontochelys lived in coastal or freshwater environments based on its hand proportions, which were similar to those of modern turtle species that live in small, slow-moving bodies of water.

Joyce (2015) supported a terrestrial origin for turtles based on his study of Eunotosaurus, a taxon now recognized as a millerettid stem reptile. His study noted that the hands of Odontochelys were not comparable to any modern turtles due to the retention of a plesiomorphic ("primitive") feature: four phalanges (finger bones) in the third and fourth fingers, rather than three. While the total relative finger lengths of Odontochelys do line up with those of semiaquatic freshwater turtles, the individual phalanges (finger bones) themselves were short and stout, much more similar to those of modern tortoises. Aquatic turtles achieved long hands by lengthening their phalanges, while Odontochelys retained long hands due to its plesiomorphic phalangeal count, similar to that of other reptiles (including terrestrial ones). In addition, Joyce (2015) argued that even if Odontochelys was semiaquatic, it probably would have avoided open marine waters due to a lack of efficient adaptations for swimming.

On the other hand, a pathological study of Odontochelys performed by Rothschild & Naples (2015) discovered that both the left and right humeri (forearm bones) of the paratype specimen (IVPP 13240) of Odontochelys had been degraded near the shoulder sockets. The study rejected explanations such as weathering or a wound-induced bone infection, arguing that it would not have made sense for the shoulder area to degrade before the rest of the forelimbs, since the shoulder was better protected during life and after death. Instead, the study argued that decompression sickness was responsible for the injury. This condition has been observed in diving animals which are forced to make rapid ascents within a deep marine environment. Similar injuries have been reported in other fossilized marine reptiles, and their presence in Odontochelys supports the idea that it lived in an open marine environment. Modern sea turtles utilize behavioral tactics to avoid rapid ascent within water, which may also indicate that Odontochelys had not yet acquired the same behaviors to defend against decompression sickness.

Evidence from δ^{13}C, δ^{18}O, and δ^{34}S measurements derived from its bones indicates that Odontochelys lived in nearshore marine habitats and rules out that it was a strictly terrestrial animal. This isotopic evidence also suggests that it was a herbivore that foraged in a similar manner to the modern marine iguana.
