= Australochelys =

Australochelys Temporal range: Early Jurassic, 190–183 Ma

Scientific classification
- Kingdom: Animalia
- Phylum: Chordata
- Class: Reptilia
- Clade: Pantestudines
- Clade: Testudinata
- Clade: Rhaptochelydia
- Family: †Australochelyidae
- Genus: †Australochelys; Gaffney & Kitching, 1994

Type species
- Australochelys africanus Gaffney & Kitching, 1994

Extinct genus of turtles

Australochelys is an extinct genus of rhaptochelydian turtle. It is known from one species, A. africanus, that came from the Elliot Formation of South Africa. The holotype of Australochelys consists of only a skull and a fragment of the carapace, which shows both primitive and derived features. Like Proganochelys, Australochelys has large orbits and a ventral basioccipital tubercle, but like derived turtles such as casichelydians, a group containing Cryptodira and Pleurodira, it possesses a sutured basipterygoidal attachment, and a middle ear region partially enclosed laterally. These characteristics show that Australochelys is more closely related to casichelydians than to Proganochelys, and together with the former, it makes up Rhaptochelydia. The skull of Australochelys shows that an advanced hearing mechanism of turtles evolved before the appearance of modern turtles.

== Etymology ==
Australochelys africanus was named in 1994 by Eugene S. Gaffney and James W. Kitching. The generic name comes from the Greek australos, meaning "south" and chelys, "turtle". The specific name is derived from the Greek africanus, meaning "from Africa".

== Description ==
=== Skull ===
The holotype of Australochelys includes a skull and a fragment of the carapace. The skull shares features with both the primitive turtle Proganochelys and Casichelydia, a group of derived turtles. The skull shows an advanced hearing mechanism, a feature thought to have evolved with modern turtles.

=== Distinguishing characteristics ===
Many features were found among Australochelys that function to distinguish it from other turtles. Below are the characteristics found by Gaffney and Kitching in 1995 that are unique among all turtles:

- an orbit larger in relative size than in any other turtle;
- a lacrimal foramen at least three times larger than in Proganochelys;
- the external nares elongated in contrast to all turtles;
- and vomers arched dorsally, narrow posteriorly, and very broad anteriorly in a unique configuration.

Below are features that are only found in turtles between Australochelys and Proganochelys, but also present in tetrapods:

- the presence of nares formed by the premaxilla divided external;
- large interpterygoid vacuity like in Proganochelys;
- an unenclosed middle ear region;
- a recessed, funnel-shaped, cavum tympani absent;
- lacrimal foramen present;
- recessus scalae tympani and fenestra perilymphatica absent;
- foramen jugulare posterius with at least a medial edge absent;
- and the presence of a cultriform process.

Below are characteristics found in Australochelys and Casichelydia but not in Proganochelys:

- a sutured basipterygoid articulation;
- a stapes that probably does not articulate directly with quadrate but may have attached to a tympanic membrane supported by the acute posterior edge of the quadrate;
- a distal end of opisthotic covered by quadrate;
- a well-defined canalis cavernosus canal;
- few or no palatal teeth;
- a distinct crista supraoccipitalis vertical bone sheet;
- and a temporal roof that extends posteriorly over opisthotic.

== Classification ==
Australochelys shows a strange mix of basal and derived characteristics. This led Gaffney and Kitching to classify it in two new groups, Rhaptochelydia and Australochelyidae. Rhaptochelydia includes Australochelyidae and Casichelydia, a group including the derived groups Cryptodira and Pleurodira.

Below is a simple cladogram found by Gaffney and Kitching in 1995 demonstrating the relationships of Australochelys:

- Testudines
  - Proganochelys
  - Rhaptochelydia
    - Australochelys
    - Casichelydia
      - Cryptodira
      - Pleurodira

== Paleoecology ==
Australochelys is from the Early Jurassic Elliot Formation, a formation that dates around 190 to 180 million years ago. This makes it the oldest african turtle, a record that was previously held by a fragmentary specimen from the Gokwe Formation, which was dated to the Late Jurassic. Other than the fragmentary possible remains, the oldest definite specimens date to the Early Cretaceous of Africa, which shows about a 60 million year gap between themselves and Australochelys. The holotype of Australochelys was found in a Tritylodon horizon, in the middle section of the formation.
