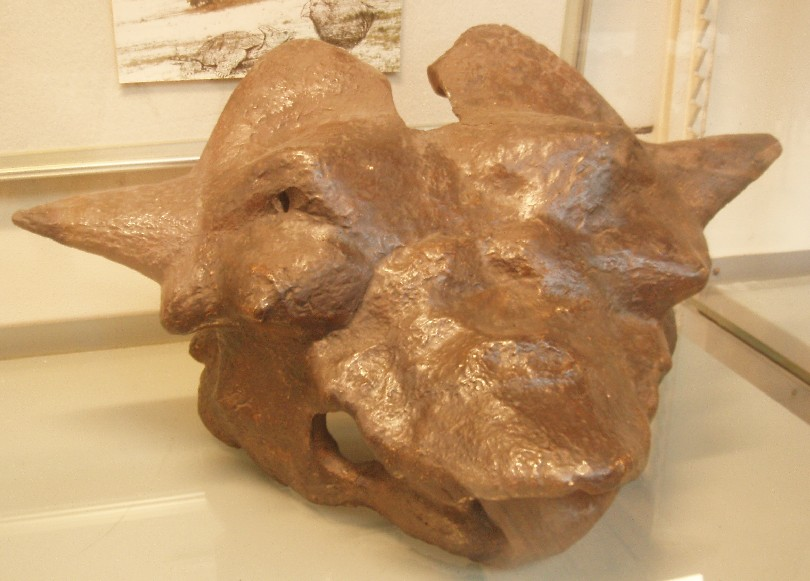
- Reconstructed fossil skull

Scientific classification
- Kingdom: Animalia
- Phylum: Chordata
- Class: Reptilia
- Clade: Pantestudines
- Clade: Testudinata
- Family: †Meiolaniidae
- Genus: †Ninjemys; Gaffney, 1992
- Species: †N. oweni

Binomial name
- †Ninjemys oweni (Woodward, 1888)

Synonyms
- Meiolania oweni Woodward, 1888

= Ninjemys =

Ninjemys Temporal range: Late Pleistocene

Extinct genus of turtle

Ninjemys oweni is an extinct large meiolaniid stem-turtle from Pleistocene Queensland and possibly New South Wales (Australia). It overall resembled its relative, Meiolania, save that the largest pair of horns on its head stuck out to the sides, rather than point backwards, the larger scales at the back of its skull and the tail club which is made up of only two tail rings rather than four. With a shell length of approximately 1 m (3 ft 3 in) it is a large turtle and among the largest meiolaniids. Ninjemys is primarily known from a well preserved skull and associated tail armor, which were initially thought to have belonged to the giant monitor lizard Megalania (Varanus priscus).

== History and naming ==
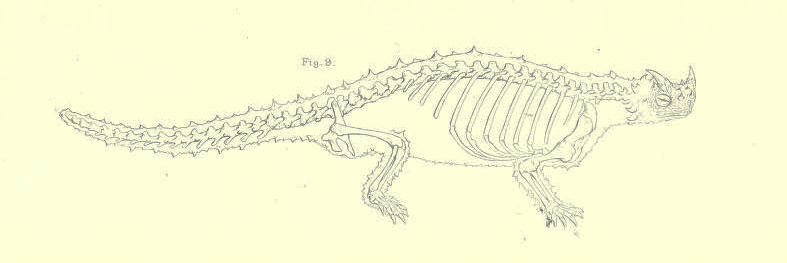
Megalania as reconstructed by Owen in 1880, featuring a head based on Ninjemys

The remains of Ninjemys were found at the King's Creek locality in Darling Downs, Queensland, in 1879 by G. F. Bennett, an Australian collector. The King's Creek deposit is believed to be of Pleistocene age, though the precise dating is uncertain. Recognizing the fossil skull as that of a turtle, Bennett sent the material to the prolific paleontologist Richard Owen. However, despite Bennett's letters to Owen correctly identifying the material's origin, Owen assigned the fossil to the giant monitor lizard Megalania, which also included the missidentified leg bones of diprotodontid marsupials. The skull was later deposited in the collections of the Natural History Museum, London, where it has register number NHMUK PV R 391. 1880 saw the discovery of a fossil of a fully armoured tail, later described as resembling that of a Glyptodon, which was recovered from the same spot in King's Creek that also yielded the turtle skull. Like the skull, this partial tail (now NHMUK PV R 392) was initially assigned to Megalania. The chimeric nature of Owen's giant lizard was still not recognized by him when he described the remains of another meiolaniid turtle in 1886, Meiolania from Lord Howe Island, continuing to believe that the two were lizards related to the thorny devil. It was Thomas Henry Huxley who first identified Meiolania as a turtle in 1887 and placed the Queensland skull alongside it in the genus Ceratochelys. A. S. Woodward, who was examining the various materials assigned to Megalania and recognized the additional presence of marsupial bones, pointed out that Meiolania took precedence and thus described the Queensland skull as Meiolania oweni in 1888, thus placing it in the same genus as the Lord Howe Island turtle. Due to its proximity to the skull material, the armored tail ring and club were both considered to have also been those of Meiolania oweni. There is however the possibility that the material could have belonged to a second type of meiolaniid, known to have been present in Pleistocene Queensland. By 1992 meiolaniid turtles had become understood enough for researchers to recognize clear anatomical differences between Meiolania platyceps and Meiolania oweni, which they had already begun to refer to as "Meiolania" oweni. As the material lacked the synapomorphies of Meiolania proper, Eugene S. Gaffney and other researchers argued that it should be placed within its own genus as it would otherwise render Meiolania paraphyletic. To amend this issue, Gaffney coined the genus Ninjemys for this species. There are several isolated meiolaniid remains which may be examples of Ninjemys, however it is not certain if they actually stem from the same taxon. In at least one case, the fragments of a tail club found in New South Wales, Gaffney assigns the material to cf. Ninjemys oweni.

Gaffney explains the etymology of Ninjemys to be "in allusion to that totally rad, fearsome foursome epitomizing shelled success" combined with the Latin word "emys" (turtle), a reference to the Teenage Mutant Ninja Turtles. The species name coined by Woodward meanwhile honors Richard Owen, thus Ninjemys oweni.

== Description ==
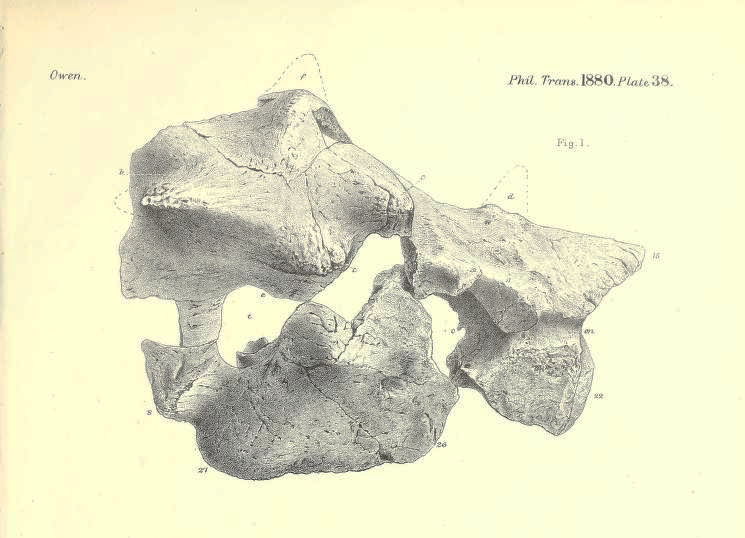
An illustration of the holotype skull of Ninjemys without plaster

Ninjemys was a large turtle with a broad head and distinct horn-like protrusions along the back of the head and an armored tail ending in a small tailclub. Like in other meilaniids, the skull of Ninjemys was highly ankylosed (fused), obscuring the sutures between the individual cranial bones. However, the scales covering the head and the horns of meilaniids leave prominent marks on the underlying bone, which have been used as substitutes for the fused sutures and are deemed diagnostic for the different genera. Additionally, the shape and size of the horns of these turtles also differs notably between the members of this family. The most prominent horns or scale areas are located at the back of the skull and designated A, B and C (from back to front) by Gaffney.

A unique feature of Ninjemys is the orientation of the second pair of horns, known as B horns. In Meiolania these horns are curved backwards, somewhat resembling cows and not forming a continuous shelf with the other horns. However, in Ninjemys these prominent horns are straight and directed towards the side. They are also not as conical as in Meiolania and instead are somewhat flattened. These horns add to the already great width of Ninjemys' skull, with the distance between them being close to 70 cm (28 in). This however renders it impossible for the turtle to retract the head into its shell. The A scale area, which is located behind the B horns and forms the back edge of the skull, is intermediate in size between those of the Argentinian Niolamia (large A scale) and Meiolania (small A scale). The C horns, which are located before the enlarged B horns, are rather small and conical. The top of the head, predominantly formed by scale area D, is raised to form a shallow dome rather than the flat head of Meiolania. The D scales likely met in the middle of the skull, adjacent to a singular scale X situated right in the middle. The scale areas Y and Z, which cover the top of the snout in Ninjemys are both relatively large.

Unlike in other meiolaniids, the nasal bone of Ninjemys extends much further beyond the rest of the skull, making the skull appear as if it had a pointed nose. Although the external nares only have a single opening, the inner section of the nasal aperture, the inner nostrils, are partially divided in two by bony projections of the nasal and maxillary bone. In addition to the main grinding (triturating) surface of the palate bone, Ninjemys also possessed a secondary, accessory ridge closer to the midline of the skull that is better developed than the one seen in Meiolania, while Niolamia shows no such ridges at all.

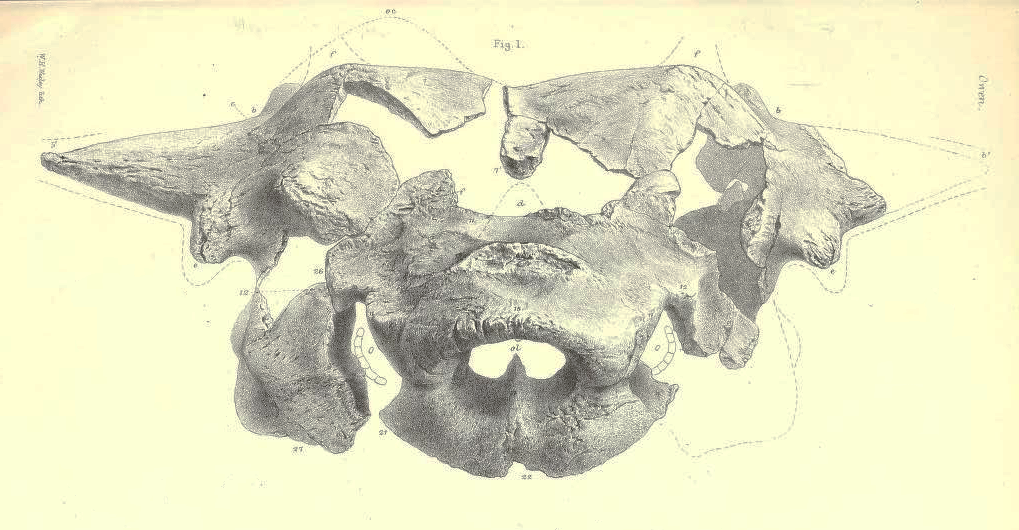
Front view of Ninjemys, showing the partially divided inner nostril

As in other meiolaniids, the long tail of Ninjemys was encased in a series of bony rings that form a club towards the end. In Ninjemys these rings close towards the bottom like in Niolamia, creating a fully formed circle whereas the rings in Meiolania are open at the bottom. The bony rings form several spikes that protrude outwards, with Ninjemys possessing two pairs. The smaller lateral bosses, which vary in their position based on where on the tail the ring is situated, and a pair of larger spikes atop the ring. The tail club was comparably short, created from only two spiked segments rather than four like in Meiolania, but overall more massive.

Ninjemys is considered to be among the largest species of meiolaniid, with a skull similar in size to that of the Wyandotte species of Meiolania. This is however not reflected by the estimates provided by Rhodin and colleagues, who calculate a potential carapace length of only 1 m (3.3 ft) for Ninjemys but up to 2 m (6.6 ft) for the Wyandotte Meiolania. MacPhee and Sues estimated the weight of Ninjemys at 200 kg (440 lb) and give a similar estimate for the Wyandotte Meiolania (listed as Meiolania sp.), further supporting previous claims of Ninjemys being one of the largest members of its family.

== Phylogeny ==
Although Ninjemys was initially placed in the genus Meiolania, Gaffney argued in 1992 that it is morphologically distinct from the genus. Continuing to place Ninjemys in Meiolania would either render the genus paraphyletic or require the diagnostic characters of Meiolania to be altered, with Gaffney creating the genus Ninjemys to retain the prior diagnosis of the genus. Furthermore, detailed study of Ninjemys showed that in certain regards it was more similar to the much older Niolamia from the Eocene of Argentina. While Gaffney considers Niolamia a basal member of Meiolaniidae, Ninjemys and Meiolania are united by some derived features such as the presence of a second accessory ridge, the broad head and the partially separated internal nares. The large size of the A horns as well as the form of the D scale areas do however exclude it from the clade formed by the two most derived meiolaniids, Meiolania and Warkalania. The relationship with Gaffneylania on the other hand remains uncertain, primarily due to the fragmentary nature of the later causing it to appear in several possible positions within Meiolaniidae. The two phylogenetic trees below show Ninjemys' position in Meiolaniidae as recovered by Gaffney, Archer & White (1992) and Sterli, de la Fuente & Krause (2015).

- - Niolamia argentina
  - - Ninjemys oweni
    - - Warkalania carinaminor
      - - Meiolania brevicollis
        - Meiolania platyceps
        - Meiolania sp.
        - Meiolania mackayi

- - Crown Testudines
  - Meiolaniformes
    - Chubutemys copelloi
    - - - Mongolochelys efremovi
        - Peligrochelys walshae
      - - - Otwayemys cunicularius
          - Kallokibotion bajazidi
        - Meiolaniidae
          - Niolamia argentina
          - Gaffneylania auricularis ?
          - - Ninjemys oweni
            - Gaffneylania auricularis ?
            - - Warkalania carinaminor
              - Gaffneylania auricularis ?
              - Meiolania platyceps

== Paleobiology ==
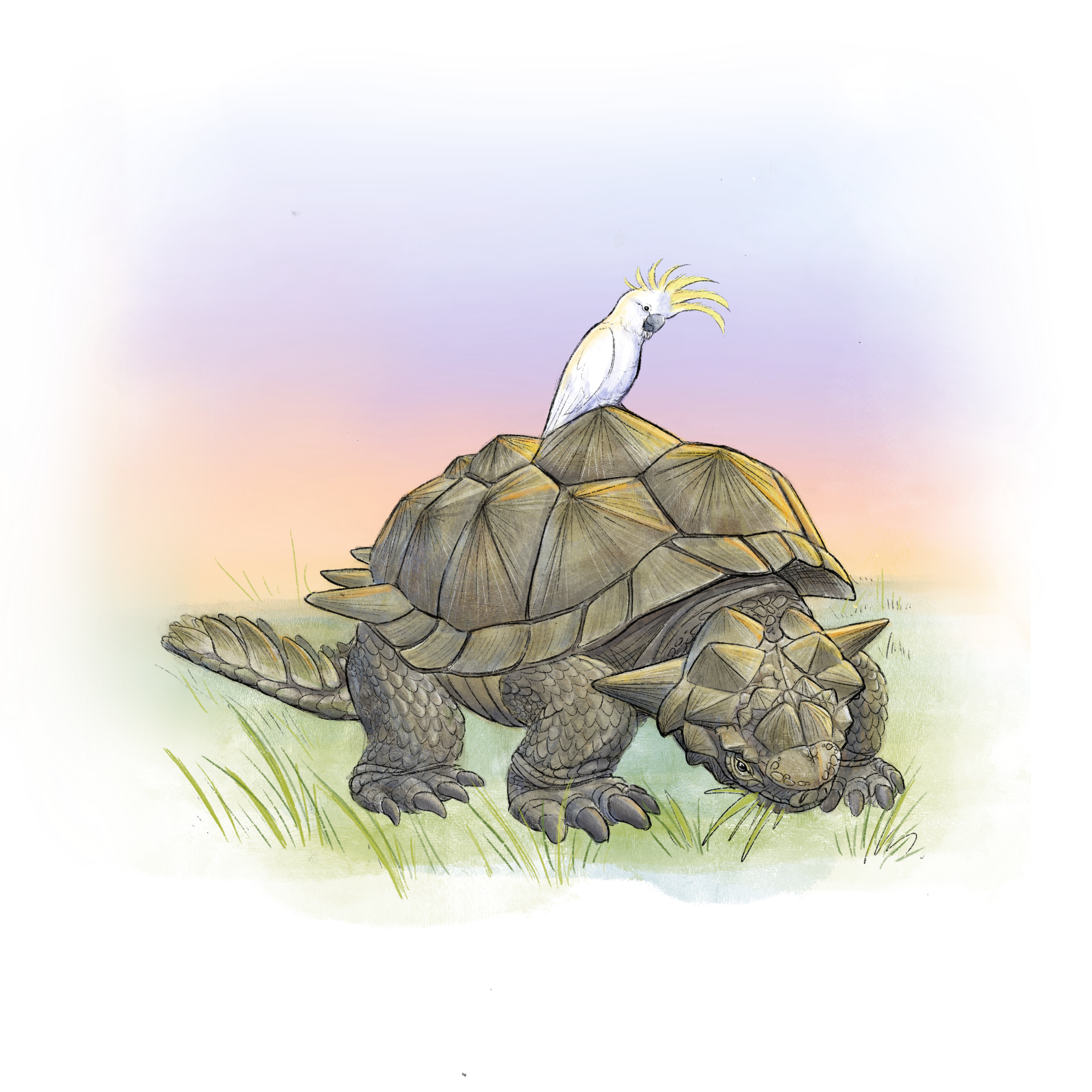
Live reconstruction of Ninjemys

Like other meiolaniids, N. oweni is believed to have been an herbivore, possibly a grazer like the related Meiolania platyceps. It is generally thought that meiolaniids such as Ninjemys were terrestrial animals that used their spiked bodies and clubbed tails either in intraspecific combat or to fight off predators.

Although meiolaniids are well armored even among turtles, theoretically increasing the likelihood that their bones would be preserved, only very few fossils of Ninjemys are known. Although the precise reason for the lack of known fossils is not known, it has been suggested that this could have been the consequence of Ninjemys being a generally rather rare animal in its native habitat, which currently only consists of Queensland and possibly New South Wales.
