= Gaffneylania =

Gaffneylania Temporal range: Casamayoran Middle Eocene

Scientific classification
- Kingdom: Animalia
- Phylum: Chordata
- Class: Reptilia
- Clade: Pantestudines
- Clade: Testudinata
- Family: †Meiolaniidae
- Genus: †Gaffneylania; Sterli et al., 2015

Type species
- Gaffneylania auricularis Sterli et al., 2015

Monotypic species of reptile

Gaffneylania is an extinct genus of meiolaniid turtle from the Eocene of Patagonia. Gaffneylania is among the earliest known meiolaniids and, much like its later relatives, possessed characteristic horns atop its head. The shell appears to have had a serrated margin. Gaffneylania is a monotypic genus, only containing a single species, Gaffneylania auricularis.

== History and naming ==
The first remains of Gaffneylania were uncovered in the summer of 2010 during fieldwork led by researchers of the Museo Paleontológico Egidio Feruglio and the Museo de Historia Natural de San Rafael. The fossils were recovered in the south-east of the Chubut Province of Argentina in the lower parts of the Sarmiento Formation. The holotype specimen, MPEF-PV 10556, consists of a partial skeleton including parts of the skull, most of the mandible, various limb remains and vertebrae as well as osteoderms and various parts of the carapace and plastron. Multiple referred specimen are also known, although these remains are less complete and primarily consist of isolated bones and shell remains.

The name honors the prolific paleontologist Eugene S. Gaffney, an authority on the anatomy and phylogeny of turtles in general and meiolaniids in particular. The second part of the name is of less clear origin. When Richard Owen named the giant monitor lizard Megalania, he translated the later part of the name as meaning "to roam about". Gaffney however argued that -lania is derived from the Greek word "lanius" meaning butcher. In this instance, Sterli and colleagues follow the etymology given by Owen. The species name meanwhile derives from auricle, the external ear, due to the prominent halfmoon-shaped rim that surrounds the tympanic cavity.

== Description ==
=== Skull and scutes ===
The skull of Gaffneylania is highly ankylosed (fused) and several of the sutures between the different skull bones are therefore not visible. The roof of the skull is not preserved, further obscuring the anatomy of the dorsal scutes. This is a huge detriment to research on this taxon, as the cranial scutes are considered to be diagnostic for meiolaniids and distinct for the different species. However, at least three scale areas are visible surrounding the deep tympanic cavity, designated scutes K1, K2 and K3. The cavity itself is surrounded by a halfmoon-shaped rim formed by the squamosal and quadratojugal, which sets Gaffneylania apart from other meiolaniids.

Like other meiolaniids, Gaffneylania's head was covered in clearly defined scutes and horns that protruded from the skull. The three K scutes surrounding the tympanic cavity are seemingly not homologous with the cheek scutes of other meiolaniids. Later Australian forms such as Meiolania and Ninjemys only possess two scutes in this region of the skull, J and K, while the Argentinian Niolamia has two J scutes, J1 and J2, and only a single K scute. This renders the three-parted K scute unique to Gaffneylania. The top most of these scale areas, K1, is positioned in a way that places it entirely atop the squamosal bone while the lowermost scale, K3, sits fully atop the quadratojugal bone, with K2 stradling the border between these two just below the tympanic cavity. An associated but disarticulated horn was also found and the shape indicates that it was the B horn of this genus. The B horns differ significantly across the meiolaniid family, being flat and directed to the sides in Niolamia and cow-like in Meiolania. The known B horn of Gaffneylania more closely resembles the contemporary Niolamia, but it is slightly curved back and up with a blunt, rounded tip as opposed to the pointed tip seen in the slightly larger Niolamia. While identified as a B horn, the exact position of this horn on the skull or how it emerged could not be determined as it broke off from the cranium at its base.

Little is known on the upper jaws of Gaffneylania, as only a small section of the premaxilla and maxilla is preserved. The triturating surface, the chewing and grinding surface of the turtle jaw, is only preserved through the outer surface and cannot be compared with more derived forms. The edges of the external nares are visible in the fossil and Gaffneylania seems to lack a dorsal process of the premaxilla, which in Meiolania splits the nares into two. The lower jaw on the other hand is preserved almost in its entirety and thus much better understood. The fossil is covered extensively in a series of pits, ridges and grooves. Similar ornamentation is seen in other meiolaniids, however it appears to be limited to the dentary and the early section of the angular bone in Gaffneylania: The triturating surface is made up entirely of the dentary and includes two cutting ridges, one lingual (closer to the tongue) and one labial (closer to the outside of the mouth). Gaffneylania lacks the accessory ridge that is present between the labial and lingual ridges of Meiolania and unlike in Meiolania or Niolamia, the labial ridge is taller. Both run parallel over most of their extent, but converge slightly towards the tip of the lower jaw. The labial ridge additionally forms a hook at the beginning of the mandibular symphysis.

=== Postcrania ===
The vertebrae of Gaffneylania generally resemble those of the later Meiolania platyceps. The forelimbs are short and robust based on the morphology of the humerus, with the authors comparing them to those of Meiolania platyceps, material tentatively referred to Niolamia and the much more basal Proganochelys. While the forelimbs are known from a complete and one partial humerus, the hindlimbs are only preserved through much more fragmentary material, specifically fragments of a femur and a tibia. The limbs were likely covered in a multitude of osteoderms, which have been found as individual fossils and were not arranged in pairs or groups. These osteoderms show a great variety in their size and shape, ranging from large teardrop-shaped elements to small disc-shaped bones. The larger osteoderms may have been present at the flanks of the forearm, while the disc-shaped osteoderms were located closer to the middle.

The carapace is primarily known from various shell fragments, which generally show characteristics typical of meiolaniid turtles. The surface of the individual plates is ornamented by fine foramina and the bones grow thicker towards the outer edge of the shell. The upper part of the shell is only loosely connected to the armor of the belly (plastron). A partial nuchal plate, which would be situated at the front of the shell, is preserved, showing a slight notch and a serrated edge towards the front. This differs from Meiolania, in which the nuchal margin of the shell protrudes. Several pleural and peripheral plates are also known, the later of which forming the outermost rim of the turtle shell. The peripherals, like the nuchal, show a serrated edge similar to what is observed in Niolamia and Meiolania. Some of the scutes that overly the bony carapace have also been identified.

== Phylogeny ==
The initial strict consensus tree produced to determine the relationship between Gaffneylania and other meiolaniids suffered from the presence of multiple polytomies. In response a reduced strict consensus tree was calculated by the researchers, recognizing that the Gaffneylania, Patagoniaemys gasparinae and Hangaiemys hoburensis were all unstable and responsible for the problems with the initial tree. Due to the lack of important fossil material such as tail raings and skull scutes, Gaffneylania was recovered in multiple different positions within Meiolaniidae, which includes a basal position along Niolamia or a more derived placement amidst the Australian genera. Despite being regarded as a wildcard taxon and its varying position within the family, it was still determined that Gaffneylania consistently nested within Meiolaniidae.

The reduced strict consensus tree is depicted below, showing the different placements that Gaffneylania might occupy within the family.

- - Crown Testudines
  - Meiolaniformes
    - Chubutemys copelloi
    - - - Mongolochelys efremovi
        - Peligrochelys walshae
      - - - Otwayemys cunicularius
          - Kallokibotion bajazidi
        - Meiolaniidae
          - Niolamia argentina
          - Gaffneylania auricularis
          - - Ninjemys oweni
            - Gaffneylania auricularis
            - - Warkalania carinaminor
              - Gaffneylania auricularis
              - Meiolania platyceps

== Paleobiology ==
Although Gaffneylania is relatively fragmentary compared to many of its relatives, the preservation of the back of the skull allowed for a more detailed analysis of its endocranium, specifically the inner ear. The angle between the anterior and posterior semicircular canals is 115°. By comparison, the angle in modern terrestrial turtles is approximately 100° and in more aquatic turtles like geoemydids and plesiochelydids 80-95°. This much wider angle is consistent with the terrestrial lifestyle typically inferred for meiolaniid turtles. Furthermore, it indicates that Gaffneylania was sensitive to low frequency sounds and likely not a very vocal animal. While the nasal cavity of Gaffneylania itself is not preserved, this inner ear anatomy is congruent with the enhanced sense of smell recovered for Niolamia and Meiolania, overall indicating that these turtles communicated more through smell than through sound. Furthermore, this may be tied to combat behavior during courtship, during which Gaffneylania may have used its spiked shell, horns and armored limbs.

== Extinction ==
Sterli and colleagues propose that meiolaniids, and other turtles, went extinct in Patagonia during the middle Eocene after building pressure from climate change, creating colder and dryer conditions. They further suggest that Australasian meiolaniids escaped the same fate due to the fact that Australia, despite being subject to the same changing climate conditions, somewhat balanced out these changes through its continuous movement northward.
