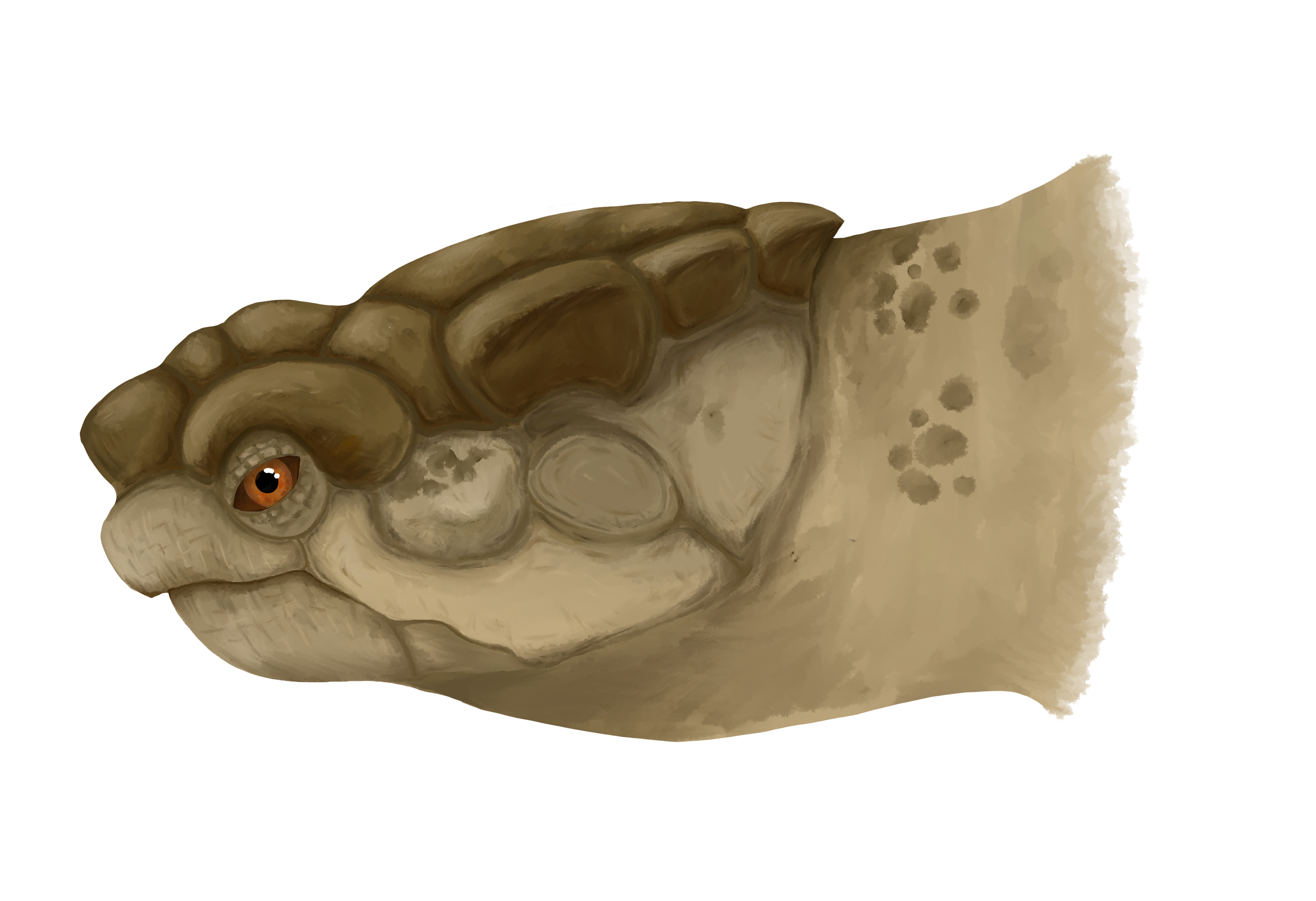
- Live reconstruction of Warkalania

Scientific classification
- Kingdom: Animalia
- Phylum: Chordata
- Class: Reptilia
- Clade: Pantestudines
- Clade: Testudinata
- Family: †Meiolaniidae
- Genus: †Warkalania; Gaffney, Archer & White, 1992

Type species
- †Warkalania carinaminor Gaffney, Archer & White, 1992

= Warkalania =

Warkalania Temporal range: Late Oligocene–Early Miocene

Extinct genus of turtles

Warkalania is an extinct genus of Australian meiolaniid turtle from the Oligocene or early Miocene of Riversleigh, Queensland. While other meiolaniids are known for their elaborate headcrests or long horns, Warkalania only possesses very short horns that form a somewhat continuous ridge across the back of the head. The only known species of this genus, Warkalania carinaminor, is the oldest named meiolaniid turtle of Australia.

== History and naming ==
Although the presence of meiolaniids in the Riversleigh fauna had been known on the basis of fragmentary remains since at least 1987, the first diagnostic remains were discovered by Neville Pledge in the form of a partial skull from strata dating to the late Oligocene to early Miocene. These remains were described by Eugene S. Gaffney, Michael Archer and Arthur White as a new genus of meiolaniid turtle they named Warkalania carinaminor. The holotype is specimen QMF 22649, a right squamosal bone including the tympanic cavity and various scales of that area, and was discovered at the Pancake Site in Queensland. Additional material has also been reported, such as QMF 22650, a left squamosal that may have belonged to the same individual as the type specimen. The other referred specimens include various skull bones including the parietals, a quadrate bone and the squamosal of at least one other turtle.

The genus name Warkalania combines the word "Warka" meaning "turtle", which Gaffney and colleagues attribute to a no closer specified Australian Aboriginal language of the Queensland region, and "lania". The suffix -lania is a common component in the names of meiolaniid turtles, also used in Meiolania, Gaffneylania and Niolamia. The meaning of the term is however interpreted differently by various authors, partly due to the lack of an etymology given in the description of Miolania. In the description of Warkalania, the word is translated as "butcher" from the Latin "lanius", but other researchers point to Owen's description of Megalania to argue that the suffix is actually derived from the Greek word for "to roam about". The species name of W. carinaminor on the other hand simply translates to "small ridge", a reference to the fact that this genus didn't possess the large horns of other meiolaniids.

== Description ==
The skull of Warkalania is highly ankylosed, entirely obscuring the sutures between the individual skull bones. Consequently, Gaffney and colleagues describe the skull largely on the basis of the contacts between the overlying scutes, which are alphabetically labeled. The individual scale areas are separated by the presence of shallow grooves, similar to Ninjemys and Niolamia and different from the raised ridges of some individuals of Meiolania platyceps. One of the referred specimens preserves scale X, which is located in the central portion of the skull between the scales D and G, likely covering the back of the frontal bones and the front of the parietal bones. Scale X is of similar size to the same scale in Meiolania platyceps from Lord Howe Island and bears the same kind of conical protrusion on its surface, though smaller than in the later species. While only a single scale X is present, the scales D and G are paired and appear to meet their respective opposite along the midline of the skull. The actual contact between D and G might also be preserved, however it appears much weaker than any other scale contacts in this animal. Much like in Meiolania, scale D lies relatively flat against the skull rather than being notably convex as in Niolamia and Ninjemys.

The roof of the cranial cavity appears to be primarily composed of the parietal bones, with some contribution by the supraoccipital bones, and includes the region that would contain the remnants of the synotic tectum. This region however is not well enough preserved to show any differences to other turtles, which are typically rather uniform in the anatomy of this element.

One of the key features that sets Warkalania apart from other meiolaniids is the shape of its horns. Meiolaniids are known for a series of horns located at the side and back of the skull, described as horns or scales A, B and C. Scale or horn A is located the furthest back of the three, while C is closest to the eyes. In other meiolaniid turtles horn C is either conical or, in the case of some Meiolania specimens, flat. In Warkalania meanwhile this element forms a horizontal ridge which continues onto horn B. While this second horn protrudes further to the side than horn C, it is still relatively short and ridge-like. Here the difference to other meiolaniids is very noticeable, as this horn is larger and conical in Meiolania, taking on an appearance similar to that of a cow's horn. There are specimens with small horn cores almost approaching the size seen in Warkalania, but none quite as small. Ninjemys and Niolamia also show very different horn shape. Both share some flattening with Warkalania, though to a lesser degree, but in these two taxa the horn appears much more like a spine that extends far beyond the rest of the head. Horn A is the furthest to the back of the three, but only incompletely known. Preserved elements suggest that it was approximately the size and shape of horn B, with some specimen showing more acute and others showing blunter edges. While only slightly larger than in Meiolania, it stands in stark contrast to the same area in Ninjemys and Niolamia. Unlike in more derived forms, these two genera have A horns much more pronounced than any of the preceding scales to the point where they form massive shelves at the back of the head. While the A horns in Warkalania also form somewhat of a shelf, it is not nearly as pronounced as in these other taxa. Overall this gives the skull of Warkalania a less ornate appearance compared to the elaborate crests in Neiolamia and Ninjemys or the distinctive bull-like horns of Meiolania.

== Phylogeny ==
Gaffney and colleagues found that Warkalania shared several features of its horns with Meiolania, including the size of the A horns, the fact that the B horns don't project laterally and the relatively flattened D scales. Considering these characters to be synapomorphies, they concluded that Warkalania was the closest relative to Meiolaniato the exclusion of both Ninjemys and Niolamia. This was later corroborated by additional studies including the phylogenetic tree recovered by Sterli et al. in their description of Gaffneylania. Both results are shown below, with the more recent tree showing the varying positions that Gaffneylania was found in due to its incomplete nature.

- - Niolamia argentina
  - - Ninjemys oweni
    - - Warkalania carinaminor
      - - Meiolania brevicollis
        - Meiolania platyceps
        - Meiolania sp.
        - Meiolania mackayi

- - Crown Testudines
  - Meiolaniformes
    - Chubutemys copelloi
    - - - Mongolochelys efremovi
        - Peligrochelys walshae
      - - - Otwayemys cunicularius
          - Kallokibotion bajazidi
        - Meiolaniidae
          - Niolamia argentina
          - Gaffneylania auricularis
          - - Ninjemys oweni
            - Gaffneylania auricularis
            - - Warkalania carinaminor
              - Gaffneylania auricularis
              - Meiolania platyceps

== Paleobiology ==
Besides the material that forms Warkalania, various other meiolaniid remains are also known from Riversleigh that cannot be confidently assigned to the genus due to the lack of overlapping material. While most of these may or may not belong to Warkalania, at least one fragment of a horn A seems to indicate that a second meiolaniid was also present. It was initially attributed to an indetermined species of Meiolania and later assigned to Meiolaniidae indet. by Gaffney. Warkalania is the oldest named genus of meiolaniid turtle from Australia, with other Oligocene and older remains being present in the form of isolated bones that are only identifiable as indetermined meiolaniids.
