= Tail club =

Animal body part

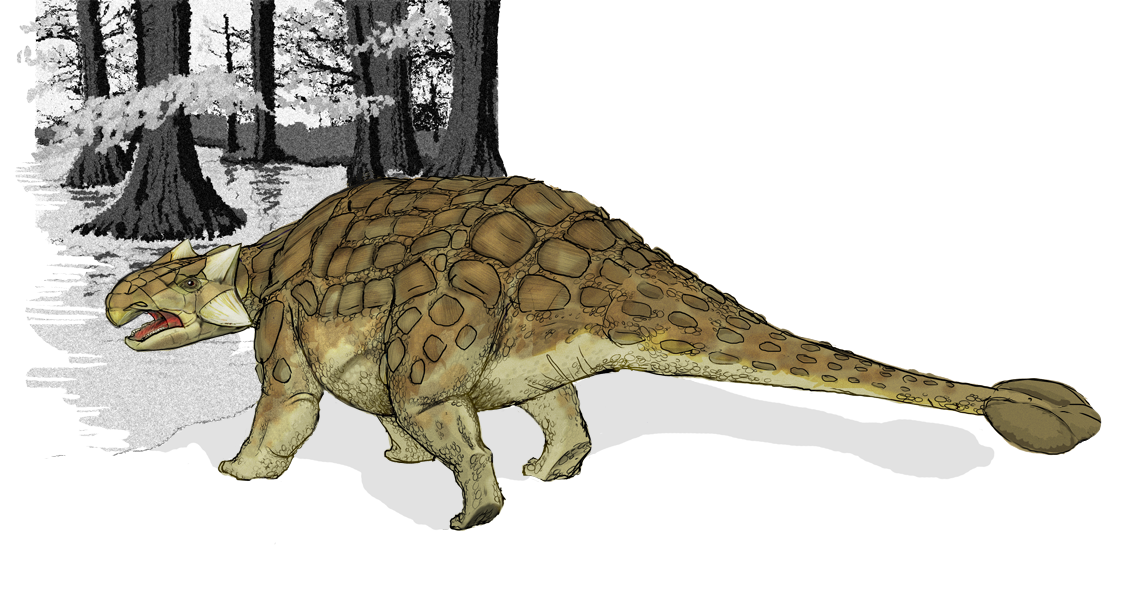
Possible appearance of Ankylosaurus and its characteristic tail club.

In zoology, a tail club is a bony mass at the end of the tail of some extinct animal species, most notably the ankylosaurids, some sauropods, glyptodonts, and some meiolaniid turtles. It is thought that this was a form of defensive armour or weapon that was used to defend against predators, similar to the thagomizer of stegosaurids. It is hypothesized that tail clubs were also used in intraspecific combat, specifically fighting for mating rights. The structure and size of tail clubs vary greatly between species. However, no known extant animals possess structures even resembling tail clubs.

== Ankylosaurids ==
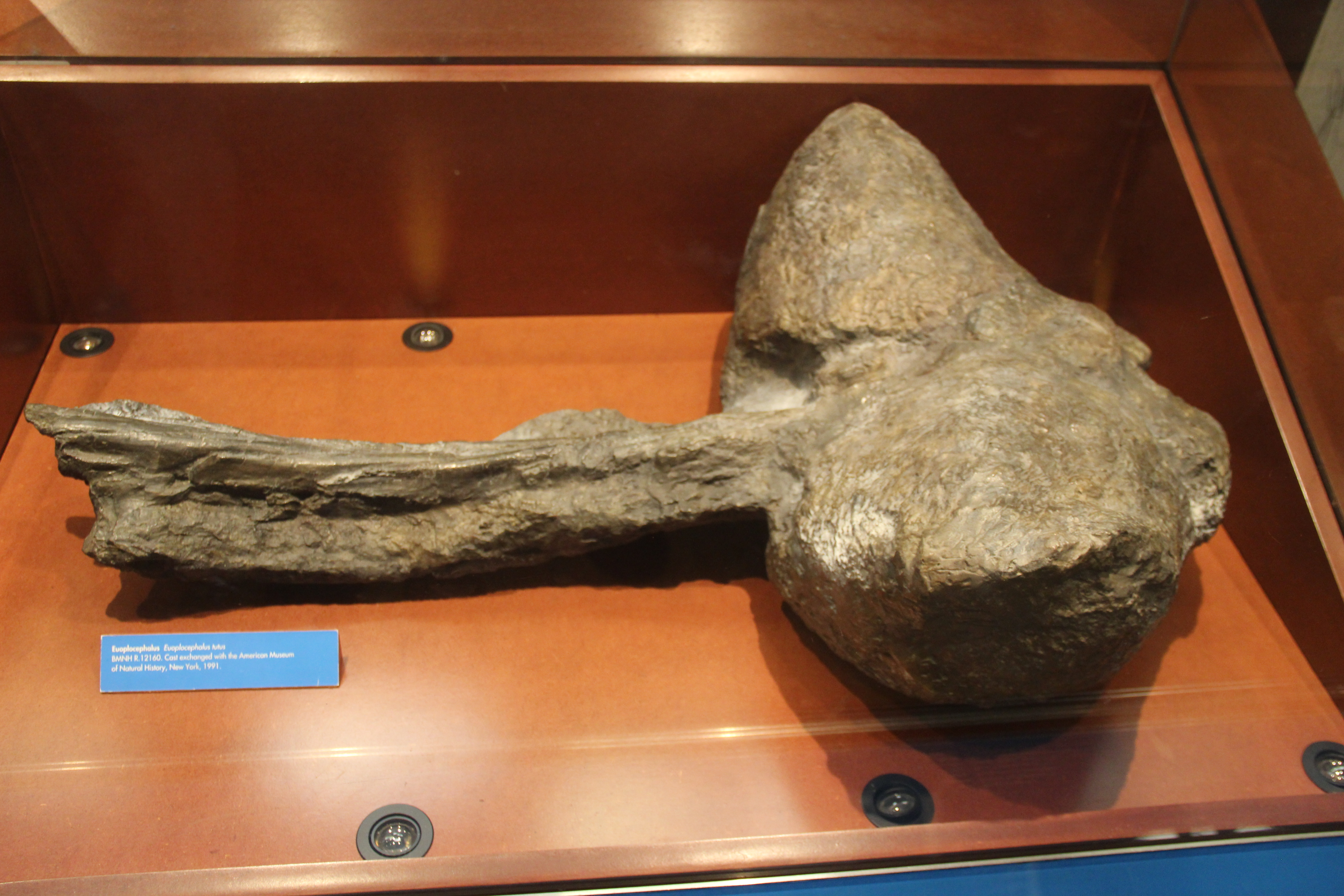
A fossilized Euoplocephalus tail club specimen from the Natural History Museum in London.

In ankylosaurid dinosaurs, the tail club—or "knob"—consists of enlarged and fused osteoderms, being supported by a "handle" composed from stiffened far-distal vertebrae, and using the prezygapophyses to inlock, ensuring the structure's rigidity. The knob typically has bilateral symmetry in the two major plates, although one plate may be bigger than the other in some cases. The tail club is also covered in minor plates along the very distal part of the structure, with the shape, size, and placement of these plates varying between species and individuals.

Walter P. Coombs Jr. identified three generalized but largely arbitrary categories of tail club knobs in ankylosaurids; round knobs are said to be the most common kind, taking on a circular or oval shape when viewed from above. The second category features bluntly-pointed knobs, which are described as being wider than they are long. They have a flat dorsal plane, with the ventral plane curving upwards to meet the dorsal plane at a sharp angle. Lastly, the elongate category includes knobs that are longer than they are wide, with the dorsal and ventral planes meeting halfway on the knob formation.

Victoria Arbour found that ankylosaurid tails could generate enough force to break bone during impacts. In a separate study, Arbour suggested tail clubs as well as large armoured herbivores as a whole evolve when these animals are too large to hide and too small to avoid predation by size alone. Arbour also put forward the theory that tail clubs in ankylosaurids evolved primarily as a result of sexual selection, rather than a defense against predation. This was the result of analyzing a well preserved Zuul crurivastator fossil with preserved impact sites from tail clubs, along with evidence of healed osteoderms. Arbour suggested that ankylosaurids may have hit each other with their tail clubs in a show of dominance similar to how giraffes fight each other using their necks.

== Sauropods ==
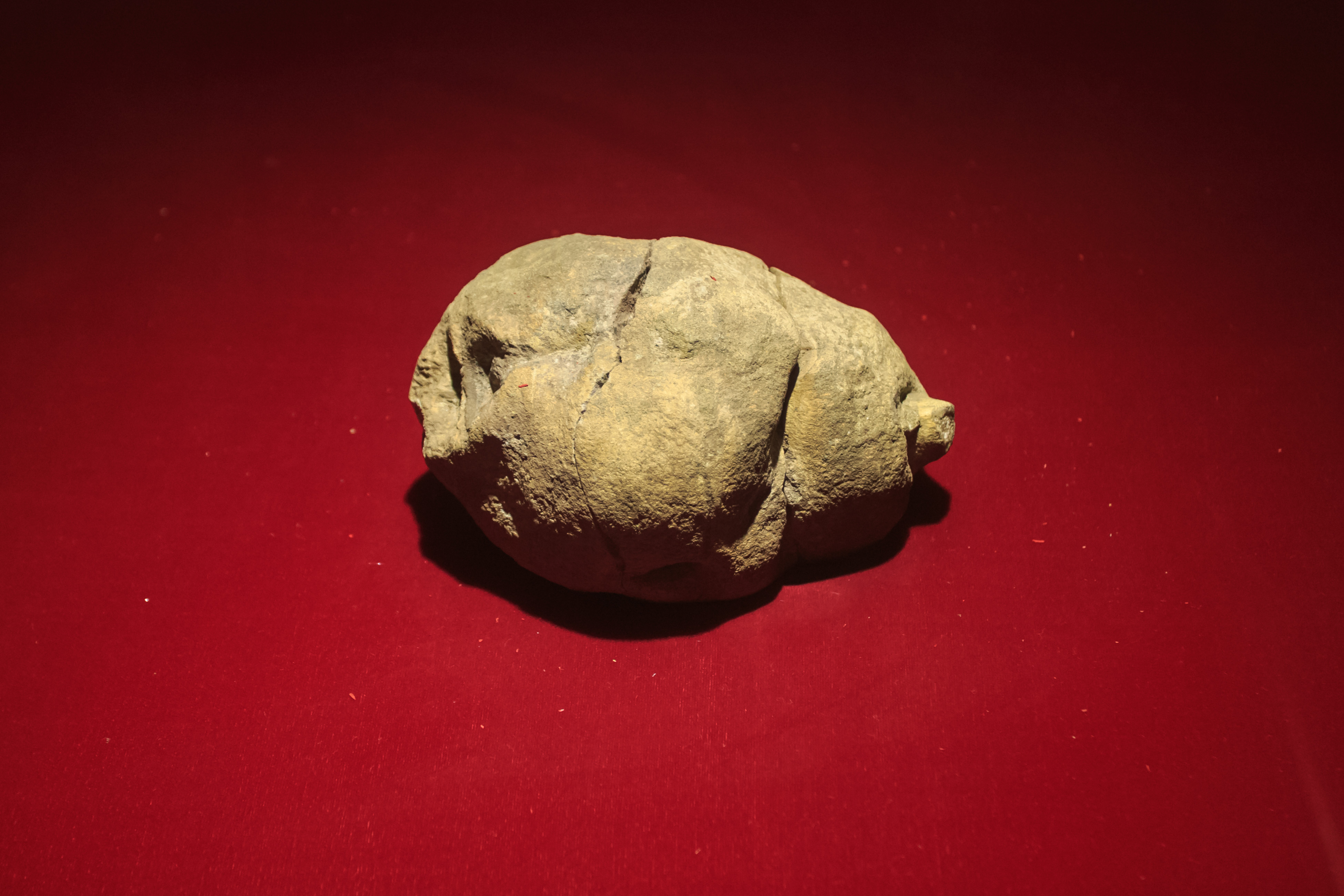
A Shunosaurus tail club fossil from the Zigong Dinosaur Museum in China.

A number of Late Jurassic sauropod fossils have exhibited fusion of caudal tail vertebrae reminiscent of tail clubs. These tail clubs largely differ from their anklyosaurid counterparts in shape and size. Sauropod tail clubs are much smaller in proportion to the body compared to anklyosaurids. In addition, sauropods generally have more elliptical tail clubs, with narrowed ends and inflated centers.

Examples include Shunosaurus and Omeisaurus, sauropods from the Sichuan province of China with evidence of tail club formation. Shunosaurus had a round knob covered in two distinct spikes both roughly 5 cm (2 inches) long. Omeisaurus lacked these spikes, but its club was larger in size. Both clubs were made up of 3-5 distal caudal vertebrae.

Another Chinese dinosaur, Mamenchisaurus hochuanensis, also has one specimen possessing a tail club structure. This club had a coronal shape and was made of four distinct caudal vertebrae. It is theorized that, while this tail club likely would not have been useful as a method of defense, it could have instead been used as a sensory organ.

Kotasaurus yamanpalliensis, whose fossils were found in the Kota Formation of India, featured a prominent tail club made of three distinctive parts. Through the use of CT scans, it was discovered that tail clubs of Kotasaurus have concentric ring-like growth structures within the bone, with larger tail clubs having more layers of rings. However, the reason for this correlation between ring structure and tail club size is still unknown.

== Glyptodonts ==
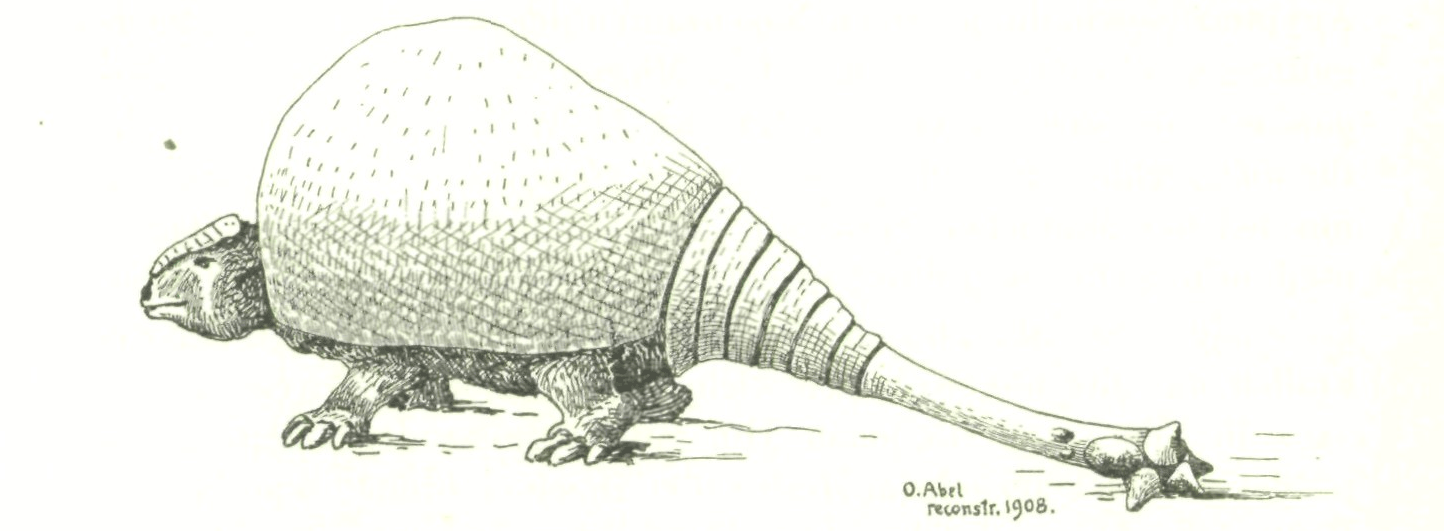
Artist's rendition of a Doedicurus, showcasing its unique tail club.

In glyptodonts, the tail is usually composed of caudal rings made of conical osteoderms, allowing some degree of freedom in terms of tail movements. In some species, such as Doedicurus and Panochthus, the osteoderms at the end of the tail were fully fused together to form a rigid tail-club tube. These clubs were strong enough to have cracked the carapaces of other glyptodonts, likely as a part of intraspecific combat. A study in 2009 found that club-wielding glyptodonts carried their center of percussion close to the largest spikes of their clubs, implying that their tails served as formidable weapons.

== Meiolaniids ==
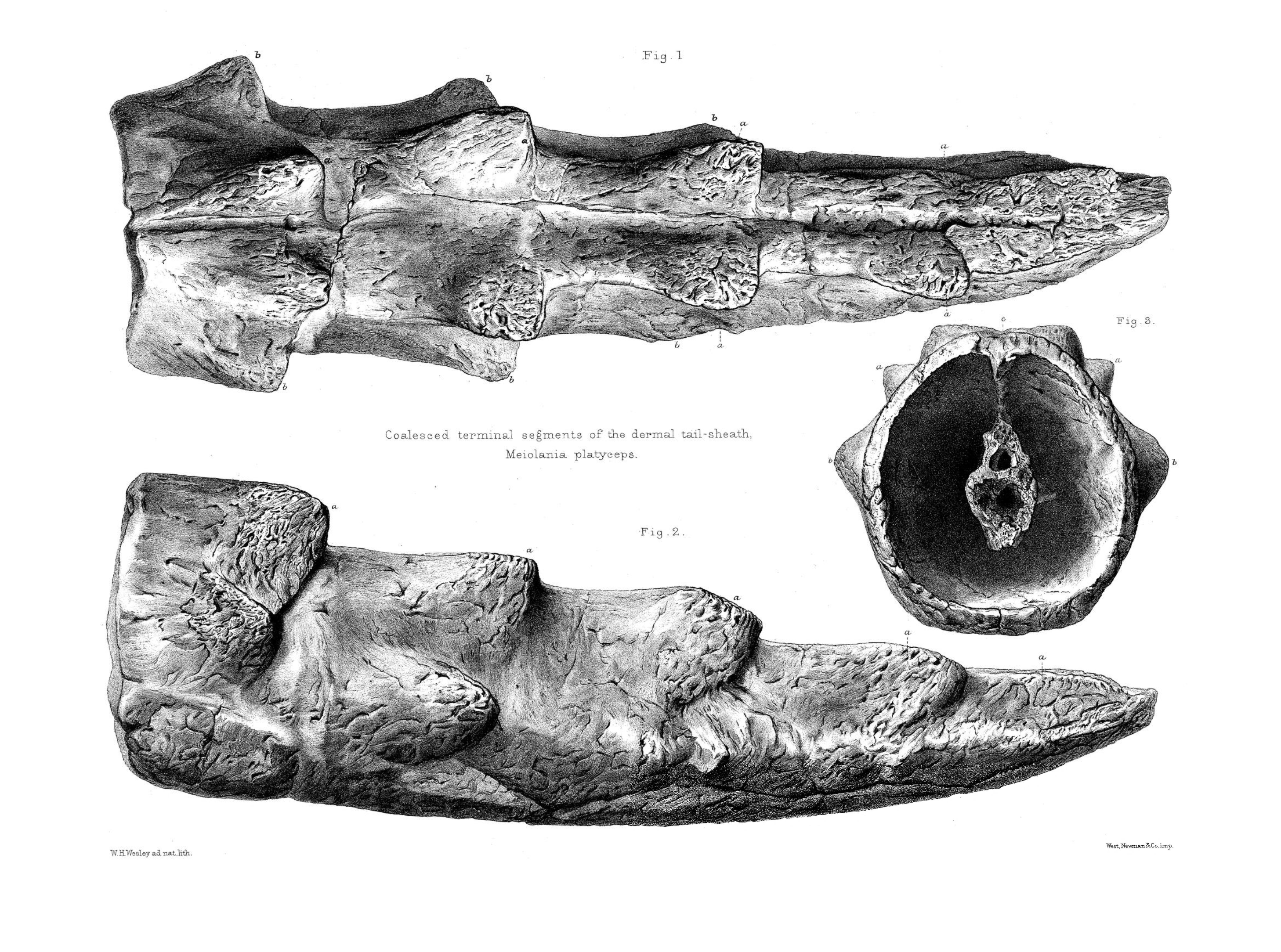
Detailed structure of the tail club of Meiolania platyceps.

Members of the extinct turtle family Meiolaniidae are often described as having heavily armored tails formed from caudal tail rings. In some species, the tip of the tail had fused osteoderms that ended in an ossified tail club, usually with large spikes jutting out from the vertebrae. Compared to other animals that exhibited tail club morphology, this family of extinct turtles had clubs that narrowed to a sharp point at the end, rather than taking the form of a conical tube or knob.

Members of the genus Meiolania exhibited tails made from many caudal rings that wrapped around each individual tail vertebra, although not fully. The rings ended in a heavy tail club with four protruding spikes.

Ninjemys oweni fossils also showcase tail club formation. While the club protrusion itself is shorter in length than Meiolania's, carrying only two spikes instead of four, the overall size of the club is bigger. In addition, the caudal rings preceding the club fully wrap around the tail vertebra, unlike in Meiolania.

It is theorized that meiolaniids used their tail clubs not only for defense against predators, but also for intraspecific combat. Some suggest that they may have utilized their heavily armored shells and tail clubs to fight for mating rights.

== See also ==
- Thagomizer
