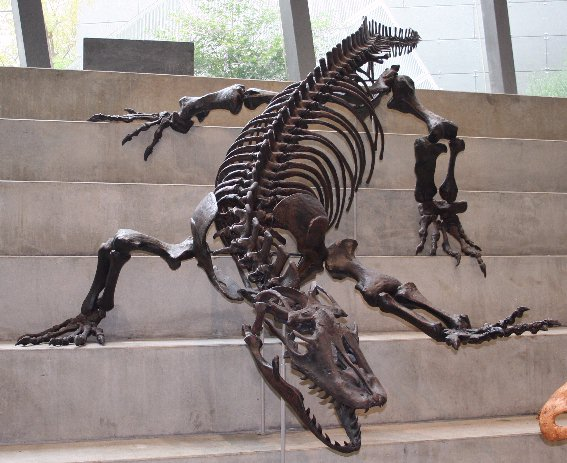
- Megalania skeletal reconstruction on Melbourne Museum steps

Scientific classification
- Kingdom: Animalia
- Phylum: Chordata
- Class: Reptilia
- Order: Squamata
- Suborder: Anguimorpha
- Family: Varanidae
- Genus: Varanus
- Species: †V. priscus

Binomial name
- †Varanus priscus Owen, 1859

Synonyms
- Megalania prisca (Owen, 1859); Notiosaurus dentatus Owen, 1884; Varanus dirus de Vis, 1889; Varanus warburtonensis Zeitz, 1899

= Megalania =

Megalania Temporal range: Pleistocene, 1.5–0.05 Ma

Extinct species of giant monitor lizard

Megalania (Varanus priscus) is an extinct species of giant monitor lizard, part of the megafaunal assemblage that inhabited Australia during the Pleistocene. It is the largest terrestrial lizard known to have existed, but the fragmentary nature of known remains make estimates highly uncertain. Studies suggest that most known specimens would have reached around 2–2.4 m (6 ft 7 in – 7 ft 10 in) in body length excluding the tail, while some individuals would have been significantly larger, reaching sizes around 4.5 m (15 ft), 5.5 m (18 ft) or perhaps even 7 m (23 ft) in total length.

Megalania is thought to have had a similar ecology to the living Komodo dragon (Varanus komodoensis) which may be its closest living relative. The youngest fossil remains of giant monitor lizards in Australia date to around 50,000 years ago. The indigenous peoples of Australia might have encountered megalania when they first arrived on the continent and might have subsequently played a role in megalania's extinction. While originally megalania was considered to be the only member of the titular genus "Megalania", today it is considered a member of the genus Varanus, being closely related to other Australian monitor lizards.

== Taxonomy ==
Fossils of Megalania were first described in 1859 by British paleontologist Sir Richard Owen in the Philosophical Transactions of the Royal Society of London, the material consisting of three vertebrae. This included two dorsal and one cervical vertebra, all of which were found in a layer of Pleistocene strata in a riverbed on a tributary of the Condamine River near Moreton Bay, Australia. These remains were purchased by the Natural History Museum in 1858, along with those of giant Australian marsupials like Diprotodon and Nototherium. He scientifically described the vertebrae as coming from a new genus and species of giant reptile, Megalania prisca. The generic name derives from the Ancient Greek words μέγας, megas, meaning "big", "tall" or "great" and ἠλαίνω ēlainō ("I roam"), in reference to the terrestrial nature of the animal. The close similarity to the Latin word: lania (feminine form of "butcher") has resulted in numerous taxonomic and popular descriptions of "Megalania" mistranslating the name as "ancient giant butcher." "Megalania" is no longer considered a valid genus, with many authors preferring to consider it a junior synonym of Varanus, which encompasses all living monitor lizards. The genera "Megalania" and Varanus are respectively feminine and masculine in grammatical gender and their specific names need to match them: prisca (feminine) and priscus (masculine).

Megalania is included within Varanus because its morphology suggests that it is more closely related to some species of Varanus than others, so excluding V. priscus from Varanus renders the latter genus an unnatural grouping. Ralph Molnar noted in 2004 that, even if every species of the genus Varanus were divided into groups currently designated as subgenera, V. priscus would still be classified in the genus Varanus, because this is the current subgenus name, as well as genus name, for all Australian monitors. Unless other Australian monitor species were each also classified their own exclusive genera, "Megalania" would not be a valid genus name. However, Molnar noted that "megalania" is suitable for use as a vernacular, rather than scientific name, for the species Varanus priscus.

=== Phylogeny ===
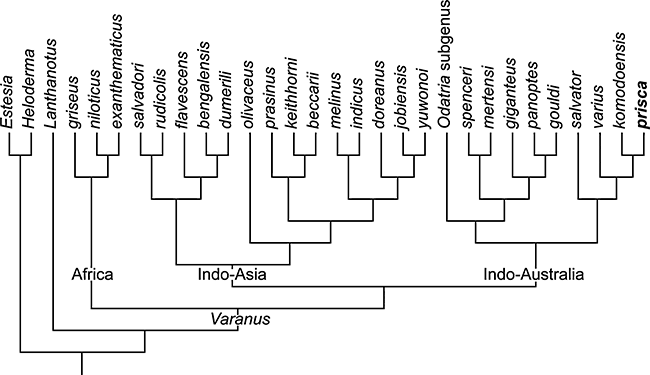

Several studies have attempted to establish the phylogenetic position of megalania within the Varanidae. An affinity with the perentie (Varanus giganteus), Australia's largest living lizard, has been suggested based on skull-roof morphology. The most recent comprehensive study proposes a sister-taxon relationship with the large Komodo dragon (Varanus komodoensis) based on neurocranial similarities, with the lace monitor (Varanus varius) as the closest living Australian relative. Conversely, the perentie is considered more closely related to Gould's monitor and the Argus monitor.

== Size ==
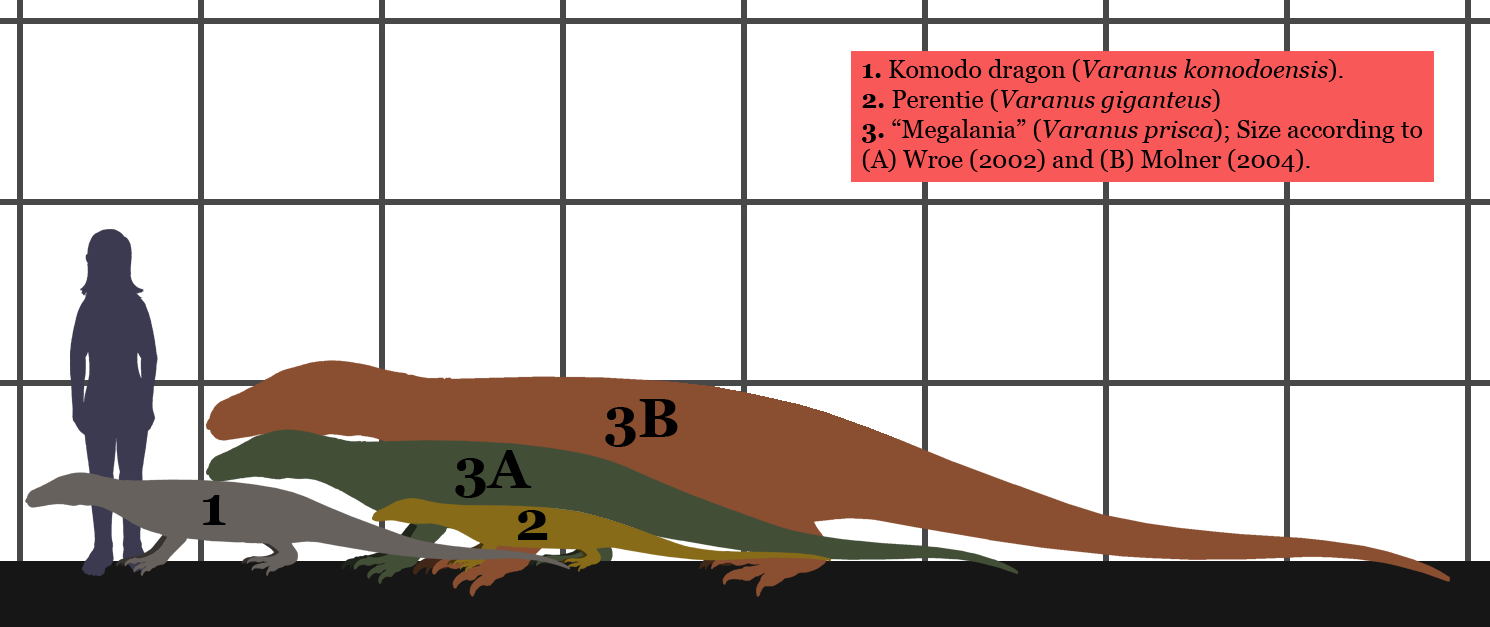
Two size estimations of megalania compared to extant monitor lizards and a human

The lack of complete or nearly complete fossil skeletons has made it difficult to determine the exact dimensions of megalania. Early estimates placed the length of the largest individuals at 7 m (23 ft), with a maximum weight of approximately 600–620 kg (1,320–1,370 lb). In 2002, Stephen Wroe considerably downsized megalania, suggesting a maximum total length of 4.5 m (14 ft 9 in) and a weight of 331 kg (730 lb) with average total lengths of 3.45 m (11 ft 4 in) and 97–158 kg (214–348 lb), decrying the earlier maximum length estimate of 7 m (23 ft) as exaggerations based on flawed methods. In 2009, however, Wroe joined other researchers in raising the estimate to at least 5.5 m (18 ft 1 in) and 575 kg (1,268 lb).

In 2003, Erickson and colleagues suggested that a large specimen with an estimated longevity of 16 years, QM F4452/3, would have belonged to an individual up to 2.19 m (7 ft 2 in) in snout-vent length based on femoral length. In a book published in 2004, Ralph Molnar determined a range of potential sizes for megalania, made by scaling up from dorsal vertebrae, after he determined a relationship between dorsal vertebrae width and snout-vent length. The average snout-vent length of known specimens were around 2.2–2.4 m (7 ft 3 in – 7 ft 10 in), and such individuals would have weighed up to 320 kg (710 lb). The largest vertebra (QM 2942) would have belonged to an individual with a snout-vent length of 3.8 m (12 ft 6 in) and weighed up to 1,940 kg (4,280 lb).

In 2012, Conrad and colleagues estimated the size of megalania based on comparing two known specimens with all known species of Varanus. The authors of the study suggested that the braincase (BMNH 39965) likely belonged to an individual around 1.78–1.9 m (5 ft 10 in – 6 ft 3 in) in precaudal length, while the largest specimen available to them (AMNH FR 6304) suggested that this individual would have reached up to 2–2.17 m (6 ft 7 in – 7 ft 1 in) in precaudal length. They also noted that it is probably possible for megalania to reach over 3 m (9 ft 10 in) in precaudal length, given that the largest specimens of modern varanid species are larger than average individuals by 151 to 225 percent.

== Palaeobiology ==
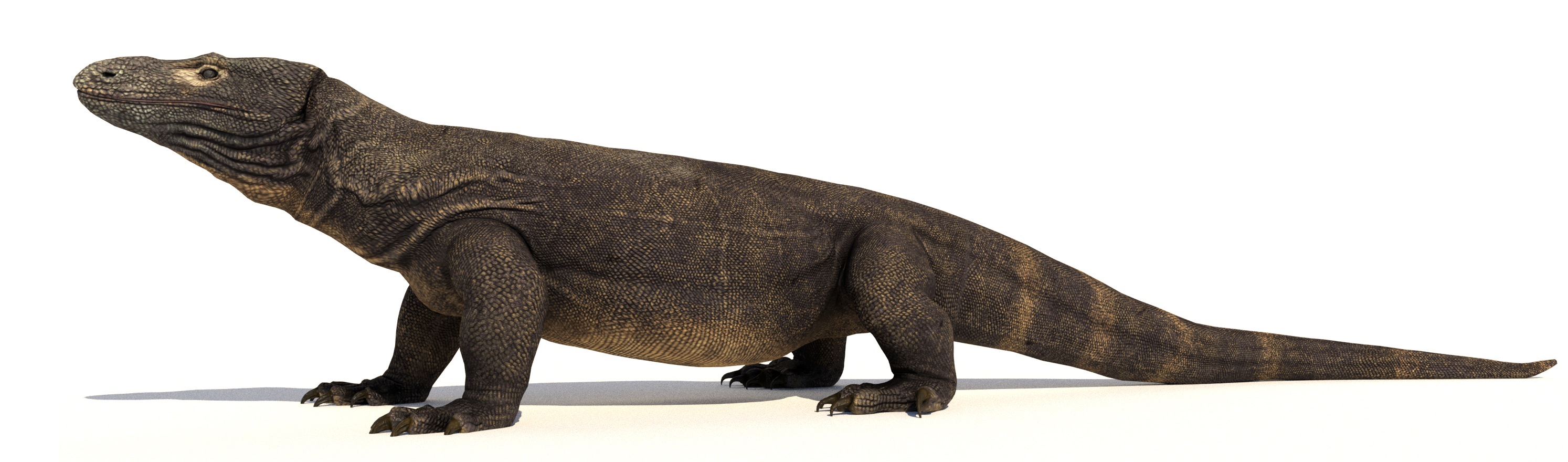
Life restoration

Megalania is the largest terrestrial lizard known to have existed. Judging from its size, it would have fed mostly upon medium- to large-sized animals, including any of the giant marsupials such as Diprotodon, along with other reptiles and small mammals, as well as birds and their eggs and chicks. It had heavily built limbs and body, a large skull complete with a small crest between the eyes, and a jaw full of serrated, blade-like teeth.

Some scientists regard with skepticism the contention that megalania was the only, or even principal, predator of the Australian Pleistocene megafauna. They note that the marsupial lion (Thylacoleo carnifex) has been implicated with the butchery of very large Pleistocene mammals, while megalania has not. In addition, they note that megalania fossils are extremely uncommon, in contrast to T. carnifex's wide distribution across Australian Pleistocene deposits. Quinkana, a genus of terrestrial crocodiles that grew up to 6–7 metres (20–23 ft) and was present until around 40,000 years ago, has also been marked as another apex predator of Australian megafauna.

Komodo dragons, megalania's closest relative, are known to have evolved in Australia before spreading to their current range in Indonesia, as fossil evidence from Queensland has implied. If one were to reconstruct the ecosystems that existed before the arrival of the humans on Australia, reintroducing Komodo dragons as an ecological proxy of megalania to the continent has been suggested.

A study published in 2009 using Wroe's earlier size estimates and an analysis of 18 closely related lizard species estimated a sprinting speed of 2.6–3 m/s (9.4–10.8 km/h). This speed is comparable to that of the extant freshwater crocodile (Crocodylus johnstoni).

The scales of megalania would possibly be similar to those of their extant relatives, possessing a honeycomb microstructure and both durable and resilient to water evaporation.

=== Venom ===
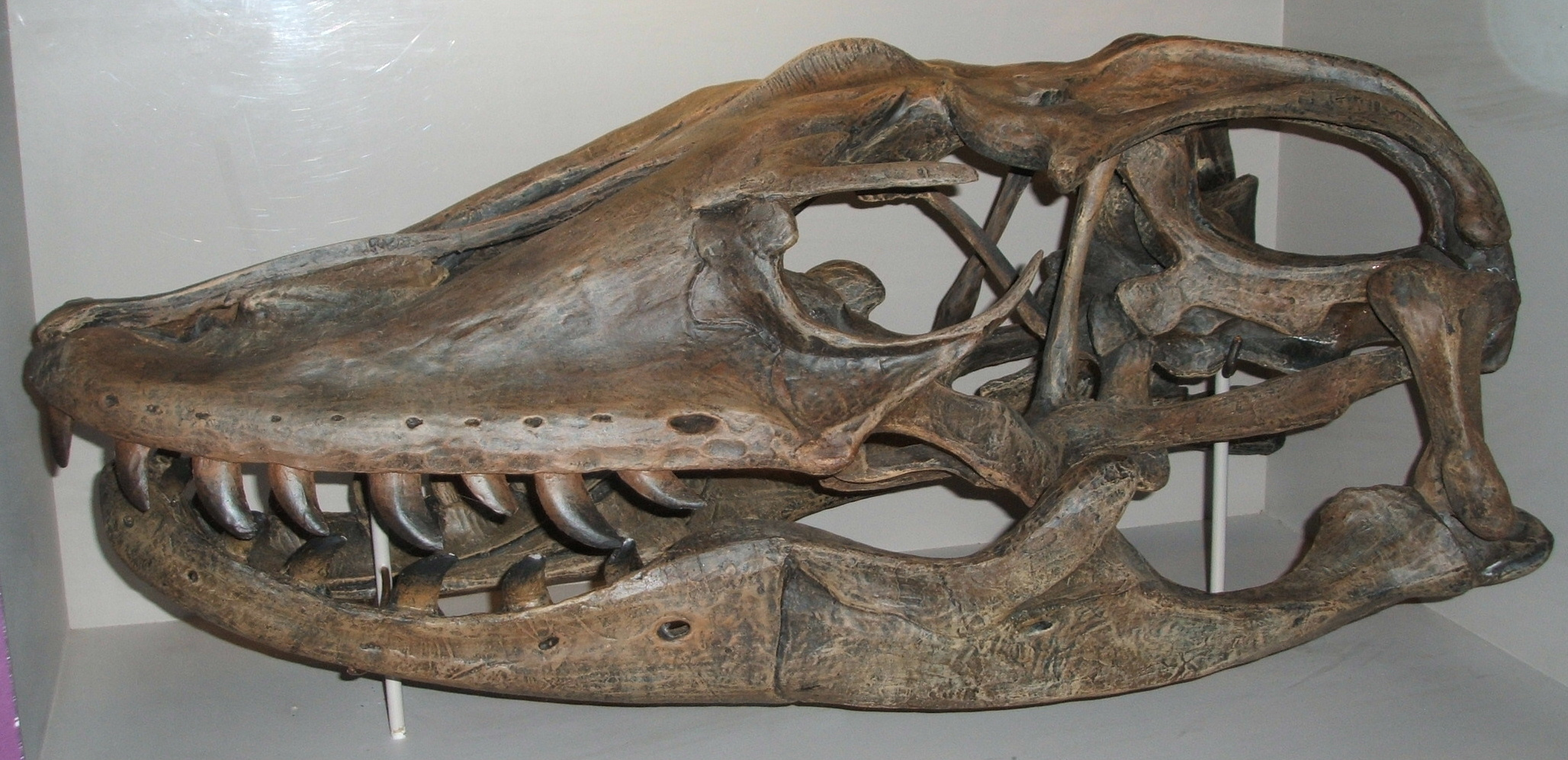
Hypothetical megalania skull, at the Museum of Science, Boston

Along with other varanid lizards, such as the Komodo dragon and the Nile monitor, megalania belongs to the proposed clade Toxicofera, which contains all known reptile clades possessing toxin-secreting oral glands, as well as their close venomous and nonvenomous relatives, including Iguania, Anguimorpha, and snakes. Closely related varanids use a potent venom found in glands inside the jaw. The venom in these lizards have been shown to be a haemotoxin. The venom would act as an anticoagulant and would greatly increase the bleeding the prey received from its wounds. This would rapidly decrease the prey's blood pressure and lead to systemic shock. Being a member of Anguimorpha, megalania may have been venomous and if so, would be the largest venomous vertebrate known.

=== Extinction ===
The youngest remains of the species date to the Late Pleistocene, with the youngest remains possibly referrable to the species being a large osteoderm dating to approximately 50,000 years ago from the Mount Etna Caves National Park in central-eastern Queensland. A study examined the morphology of nine closely related extant varanid lizards and then allometrically scaled and compared them to V. priscus, found that the musculature of the limbs, posture, muscular mass, and possible muscular composition of the animal would most likely have been inefficient when attempting to outrun the early human settlers who colonised Australia during that time. Considering many other species of Australian megafauna went extinct around the same time, either due to human predation or being outcompeted by them, the same can be assumed for megalania.

Confrontations between megalania and early Aboriginal Australians may have inspired tales of fearsome creatures such as the whowie.
