= Canjuers Lagerstätte =

Fossil deposits in France

- Stratigraphic range: Tithonian
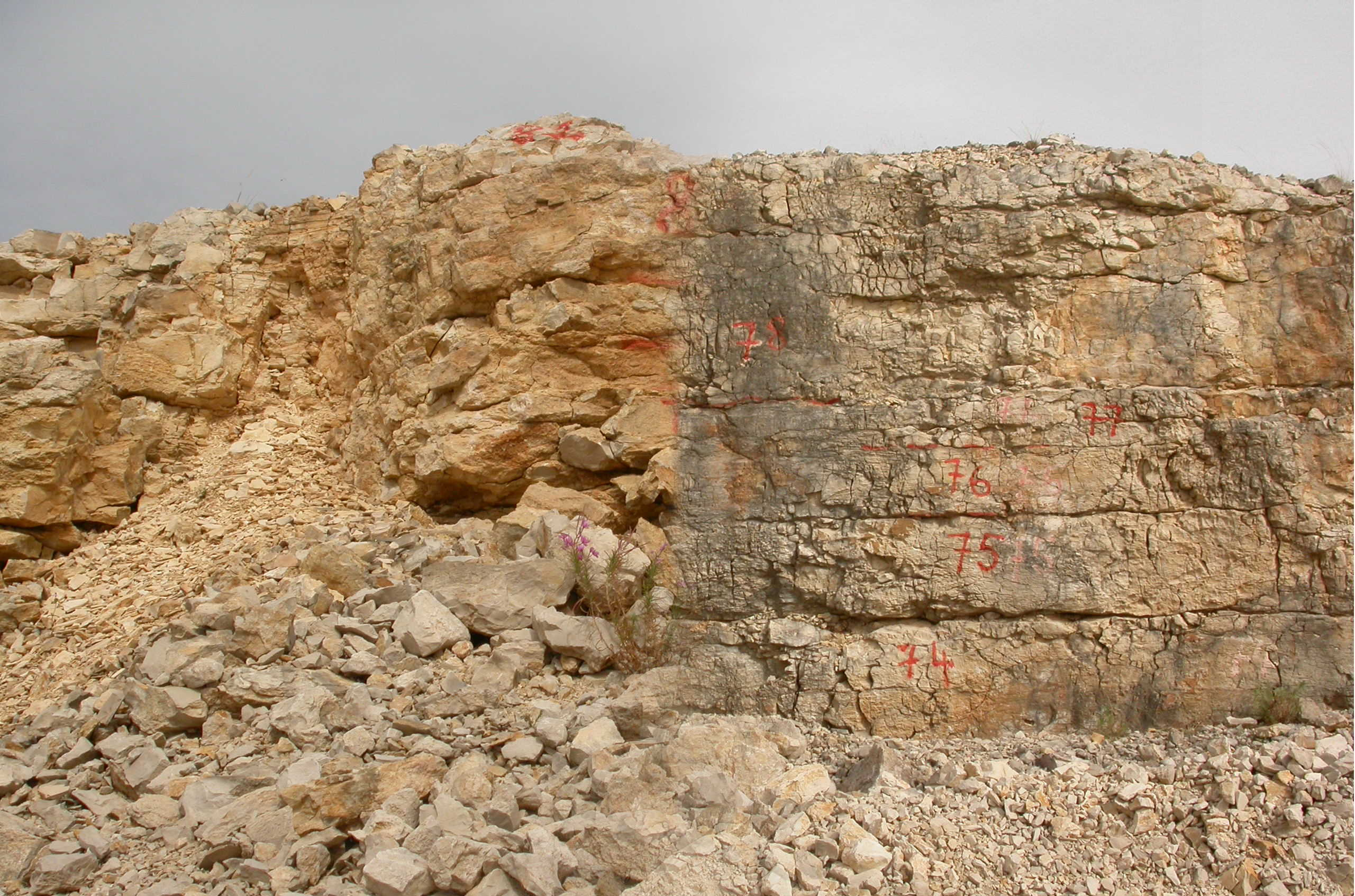
- Canjuers military camp: Bessons quarry, where the Compsognathus fossil was found
- Type: Konservat-Lagerstätte
- Unit of: 'Calcaire Blancs de Provence' Formation
- Underlies: Biomicrites de Sainte-Croix
- Thickness: 12 m

Lithology
- Primary: Lithographic limestone
- Other: Chert

Location
- Coordinates: 43.708695°N 6.374173°E
- Region: Provence-Alpes-Côte d'Azur
- Country: France

Type section
- Named for: Canjuers plateau
- Canjuers Lagerstätte (France)

The Canjuers Lagerstätte is a Konservat-Lagerstätte located inside the military camp of Canjuers, in Haute Provence, in the Var department in South-East France.

== Geology and stratigraphy ==
From a stratigraphic point of view, this fossil deposit is located inside the 'Calcaire Blancs de Provence' Formation, a 200-meter-thick limestone assemblage. The lithographic limestone of Canjuers, which bears almost all significant fossils from the Lagerstätte, is a thin layer (around 6 meters) at the basis of the Biomicrites de Sainte-Croix member, the later member of the Calcaires Blancs de Provence Fm. This layer has been dated by ammonite analysis to the Lower Tithonian (Neochetoceras mucronatum biozone), around 150 million years ago.

The Canjuers site facies outcrop in the Petit Plan de Canjuers plateau, and a quarry was exploited in the locality "Les Bessons". They correspond to deposits inside a sub-circular depression whose area is estimated to be only 1 km^{2}. Their total thickness is around 12 m. They are divided in three lithologic units, from bottom to top :

- The lithographic limestone per se, made of thin limestone, finely laminated, around 6 m thick. Those bears almost every remarkable fossils from the site (Lagerstätte).
- Bioclastic limestone 4.5 m thick. Those are packstone or grainstone limestone, with chert nodule levels. Their bioclasts are made of corals, sea urchins, bivalves, brachiopods and sponges fragments, with burrows and some plant remains. The banks show quasi-planar oblique surface.
- The sub-lithographic limestone with chert nodule levels, 1.5 m wide, in thick banks perforated by burrows attributed to the ichnotaxon Tubularina lithographica.

== Paleoenvironment ==
The lithographic limestone deposit environment was protected from the Tethys Ocean open sea by a continuous reef barrier. The lithographic limestone was deposited in a large lagoon whose various parts were successively above and below water, and where several small coral islands emerged. Meteoric water supplies are likely.

== Paleontology ==
=== Actinopterygians ===
Genus	Species	Order	Family	Images
Caturus	C. sp.	Amiiformes	Caturidae	
Eugnathus	E. sp.	Amiiformes	Caturidae	
Gyrodus	G. sp.	Pycnodontiformes	Gyrodontidae	
Proscinetes	P. sp.	Pycnodontiformes	Pycnodontidae	
Pachycormidae		Pachycormiformes	Pachycormidae	
Pholidophorus	P. sp.	Pholidophoriformes	Pholidophoridae	
Leptolepis	L. sp.	Leptolepiformes	Leptolepidae	
Tharsis	T. sp.	Leptolepiformes	Leptolepidae	
Ophiopsis	O. sp.	Ionoscopiformes	Ophiopsidae	
Elopidae		Elopiformes	Elopidae	
Lepidotes	L. sp.	Lepisosteiformes	Lepidotidae	
Belonostomus	B. sp.	Aspidorhynchiformes	Aspidorhynchidae	
Naiathelon	N. okkidion	Elopomorpha		

=== Sarcopterygians ===
Genus	Species	Order	Family	Images
Undina	U. sp.	Actinistia		
Coccoderma	C. sp.	Actinistia		

=== Chondrichthyans ===
Genus	Species	Order	Family	Images
Palaeocarcharias	P. stromeri	Lamniformes	Known from an articulated almost-complete specimen.	

=== Reptiles ===
Genus	Species	Order	Family	Images
Caesaria	C. templaria	Thalassochelydia		
Eurysternum	E. sp.	Thalassochelydia	Eurysternidae	
Solnhofia	S. sp.	Thalassochelydia		
Homoeosaurus	H. maximiliani	Rhynchocephalia	Sphenodontidae	
Leptosaurus	L. pulchellus	Rhynchocephalia	Sphenodontidae	
Piocormus	P. laticeps	Rhynchocephalia	Sphenodontidae	
Pleurosaurus	P. ginsburgi	Rhynchocephalia	Pleurosauridae	
Pleurosaurus	P. goldfussi	Rhynchocephalia	Pleurosauridae	
Aeolodon	A. priscus	Mesoeucrocodylia	Teleosauridae	
Compsognathus	C. longipes	Dinosauria	Compsognathidae	
Cycnorhamphus	C. suevicus	Pterosauria	Gallodactylidae	

=== Echinoderms ===
Genus	Species	Order	Family	Images
Plegiocidaris	P. marginata	Echinoidea	Cidaroida	
Rhabdocidaris	R. nobilis	Echinoidea	Cidaroida	
Diplocidaris	D. gigantea	Echinoidea	Cidaroida	
Hemicidaris	H. crenularis	Echinoidea	Hemicidaroida	
Acrocidaris	A. nobilis	Echinoidea	Hemicidaroida	
Hessotiara	H. florescens	Echinoidea	Hemicidaroida	
Pseudosalenia	P. aspera	Echinoidea	Salenioida	
Pleurodiadema	P. stutzi	Echinoidea	Phymosomatoida	
Acropeltis	A. aequituberculata	Echinoidea	Arbacioida	
Magnosia	M. nodulosa	Echinoidea	Arbacioida	
Pentasteria	P. sp.	Asteroidea	Paxillosida	
Geocoma	G. canjuersensis	Ophiuroidea	Ophiuridae	
Geocoma	G. aff. carinata	Ophiuroidea	Ophiuridae	
Amphiuridae		Ophiuroidea	Amphiuridae	
Ophiurella	O. aff. speciosa	Ophiuroidea	incertae sedis	
Comaturella	C. pinnata	Crinoidea	Comatulida	
Saccocoma	S. tenella	Crinoidea	Roveacrinida	

=== Brachiopods ===
Genus	Species	Order	Family	Images
Torquirhynchia	T. guebhardi	Rhynchonellida		
Septaliphoria	S. obtusa	Rhynchonellida		
Somalirhynchia ?	S. sp.	Rhynchonellida		
Juralina	J. insignis	Terebratulida		
Moeschia	M. aff. foraminata	Terebratulida		
Ismenia	I. pectunculoides	Terebratulida		
"Zeilleria"	Z. aff. pentagonalis	Terebratulida		

=== Molluscs ===
Genus	Species	Order	Family	Images
Modiolus	M. imbricatus	Bivalvia		
Entolium	E. corneolum	Bivalvia		
Chlamys	C. textoria	Bivalvia		
Spondylopecten	S. subpunctatus	Bivalvia		
Nanogyra	N. striata	Bivalvia		
Actinostreon	A. gregareum	Bivalvia		
Dorsoplanitoides	D. triplicatus	Cephalopoda		
Usseliceras	U. (Subplanitoides) altegyratum	Cephalopoda		
Usseliceras	U. (Subplanitoides) aff. spindelense	Cephalopoda		
Usseliceras	U. (Subplanitoides) cf. schwertschlageri	Cephalopoda		
Usseliceras	U. (Usseliceras) cf. franconicum	Cephalopoda		
Hibolites	H. sp.	Cephalopoda		

=== Crustaceans ===
Genus	Species	Order	Family	Images
Cycleryon	C. bourseaui	Decapoda		
Kouphichnium	K. lithographicum	Chelicerata	Xiphosura	
