= Hydropelta =

Hydropelta Temporal range: Kimmeridgian

Scientific classification
- Domain: Eukaryota
- Kingdom: Animalia
- Phylum: Chordata
- Class: Reptilia
- Clade: Pantestudines
- Clade: Testudinata
- Clade: †Thalassochelydia
- Family: †Eurysternidae
- Genus: †Hydropelta von Meyer, 1860

Type species
- Chelone meyeri Thiolliere, 1851

Extinct genus of turtles

Hydropelta is a genus of Late Jurassic turtle from marine deposits in the Jura Mountains of eastern France.

Like many other eurysternid taxa, Hydropelta was at times considered the same species as Eurysternum. Originally described as a species of Chelone, it was renamed Hydropelta by Hermann von Meyer in 1860. Later, it was synonymized with Eurysternum by Oertel (1915), but was treated as a distinct genus and possibly a synonym of Solnhofia by Lapparent de Broin et al. (1996). However, Hydropelta is distinct from other eurysternids by the characters of the fontanelles and plastron.
