= Caesaria templaria =

Caesaria templaria Temporal range: Late Jurassic, early Tithonian
- Holotype specimen

Scientific classification
- Kingdom: Animalia
- Phylum: Chordata
- Class: Reptilia
- Clade: Pantestudines
- Clade: Testudinata
- Clade: †Thalassochelydia
- Genus: †Caesaria; Spicher et al., 2026
- Species: †C. templaria

Binomial name
- †Caesaria templaria Spicher et al., 2026

Extinct turtle species

Caesaria templaria is an extinct species of stem-turtle in the testudinatan clade Thalassochelydia, known from the Late Jurassic (Tithonian age) Canjuers Lagerstätte of France. C. templaria is the only species in the genus Caesaria, known from two specimens preserving the shell and skull.

== Discovery and naming ==
Referred specimen under natural (A) and UV light (C), and in false color (D)

The first Caesaria fossil material was discovered during excavations by the Ghirardi family between 1965 and 1971. The Ghirardis had begun quarrying for ornamental stone on land they owned near the 'Les Bessons' camp area in Var, southeastern France, when they incidentally discovered a Lagerstätte site (now called the Canjuers Lagerstätte) preserving diverse fossils of plants, invertebrates, and vertebrates. These rocks represent outcrops of the 'Calcaire Blancs de Provence' Formation. In 1983, the National Museum of Natural History (MNHN) in Paris purchased part of the Ghirardis' private collection, and it is now permanently accessioned here. Among these fossils is specimen MNHN.F.CNJ77, a nearly complete turtle skeleton on a single slab. The skull and shell are preserved in their entirety, in addition to some partial cervical (neck) vertebrae and fragmentary limb bones. The Ghirardis did not record or share the exact stratigraphic positions of the specimens they collected, though the rock slabs on which the fossils are preserved indicate they derived from lithographic limestone strata.

Specimen MNHN.F.CNJ174, independently collected from this region during an excavation led by MNHN paleontologist S. Wenz, was integrated into the museum's collections alongside the Ghirardi collection in 1983. It comprises an inferiorly preserved skeleton, with much of the shell and some components of the skull. In 1994, French paleontologist France de Lapparent de Broin published a preliminary review of three Canjuers turtle specimens from the Ghirardi collection, in which she identified MNHN.F.CNJ77 as an indeterminate species of he genus Eurysternum. MNHN.F.CNJ174 remained undescribed.

In 2026, Gaël E. Spicher and colleagues described Caesaria templaria as a new genus and species of extinct turtle based on these fossil remains, designating MNHN.F.CNJ77 as the holotype specimen. MNHN.F.CNJ174 was referred to this species, receiving its first full anatomical description. The generic name, Caesaria, is an indirect reference to the type locality of C. templaria; the Canjuers plateau was, in antiquity, referred to as Campus Julii (lit. 'plain of Julius Caesar'), referencing Caesar's passage through the region during the Gallic Wars. The specific name, templaria, references the medieval Templar stronghold in Comps-sur-Artuby, a village near the Les Bessons area.
