= Neusticemys =

Neusticemys Temporal range: Tithonian

Scientific classification
- Kingdom: Animalia
- Phylum: Chordata
- Class: Reptilia
- Clade: Pantestudines
- Clade: Testudinata
- Clade: †Thalassochelydia
- Family: †Thalassemydidae
- Genus: †Neusticemys; Fernandez and de la Fuente, 1993

Type species
- Eurysternum neuquinum Fernandez and de la Fuente, 1988

Extinct genus of turtles

Neusticemys is an extinct genus of thalassochelydian sea turtle. Its type species is Eurysternum neuquinum. It is known from the Late Jurassic (Tithonian) aged Vaca Muerta of Patagonia, Argentina.

Neusticemys was originally described as a new species of Eurysternum, but was later assigned to its own genus in 1993.
