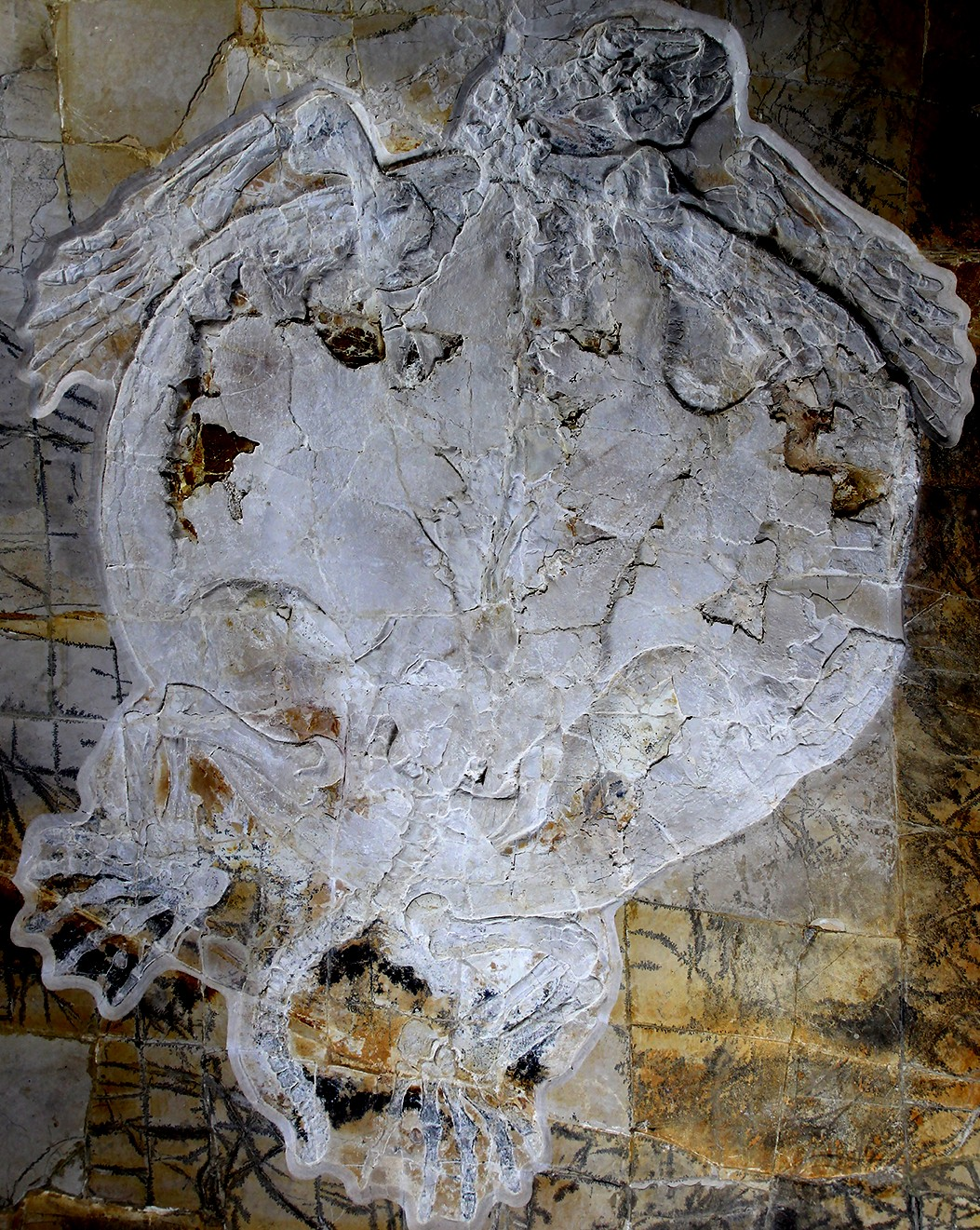
- Fossil of T. bruntrutana

Scientific classification
- Kingdom: Animalia
- Phylum: Chordata
- Class: Reptilia
- Clade: Pantestudines
- Clade: Testudinata
- Clade: †Thalassochelydia
- Family: †Thalassemydidae; Zittell, 1889
- Genus: †Thalassemys; Rütimeyer, 1873

Species
- Thalassemys hugii Rütimeyer, 1873 (type); Thalassemys marina Fraas, 1903; Thalassemys heusseri Oertel, 1924 (dubious); Thalassemys bruntrutana Püntener et al., 2015

Synonyms
- Thalassemys gresslyi Rütimeyer, 1873; Eurysternum ignoratum Bräm, 1965; Eurysternum marinum (Fraas, 1903) Maisch, 2001

= Thalassemys =

Thalassemys Temporal range: Kimmeridgian

Extinct genus of turtles

Thalassemys is a genus of extinct thalassochelydian turtle from the Late Jurassic of western and central Europe. While the genus was originally named by Rütimeyer in 1859 for a large carapace and other associated fragments from the late Kimmeridgian of the Reuchenette Formation of Switzerland, although the taxon was not validly named until 1873 when Rütimeyer designated the type species T. hugii. Rütimeyer also named T. gresslyi from the Reunchenette Formation in the same paper as T. hugii, but it cannot be differentiated from the type material of T. hugii and is therefore a junior synonym. A large assemblage of shell and postcranial material from the Reunchenette was named as a species of Eurysternum, E. ignoratum, by Bräm in 1965. While originally distinguished based on the presence of fontanelles on the plastron, the feature was later identified on T. hugii and E. ignoratum was designated a junior synonym. Additional material from the Kimmeridge Clay of the United Kingdom has also been referred to T. hugii.

The second valid species of Thalassemys is T. marina, named in 1903 by Fraas for a partial carapace and half a plastron from the late Kimmeridgian deposits of Schnaitheim, Germany. It was suggested to be a species of the related taxon Eurysternum by Maisch in 2001, who referred additional material from Schnaitheim to the species. In 2003, it was suggested that T. marina was a synonym of the related turtle Palaeomedusa, which was based on an unknown but restored region of the original carapace.

Thalassemys heusseri was validly named in 1924 by Oertel for a partial carapace from the Kimmeridgian or Tithonian of Holzen, Germany, a different spelling from the invalid name "T. heuseri" he used previously in 1815. As the type specimen was lost, the species cannot be distinguished from others of the genus, and is therefore a nomen dubium.

In addition to E. ignoratum, Bräm also named the species Thalassemys moseri in 1965 for a partial carapace from the Reunchenette Formation. An additional shell and also a skull were referred to the taxon in 1980 by Rieppel, who suggested that the species should be included in Plesiochelys rather than Thalassemys. This skull was given the name Jurassichelon in 2015, leaving the species T. moseri, based on other material, in an uncertain position. Further assessment of the material by Anquetin and colleagues in 2017 concluded that T. moseri was distinct from the species J. oleronensis named for the skull, but was representative of the same genus.

Thalassemys bruntrutana was described in 2015 by Püntener and colleagues for an almost complete carapace and plastron from a lower member of the Reunchenette Formation than other species, with referred material also from the British Kimmeridge Clay of the Isle of Purbeck.

While the genus Thalassemys was placed in the family Thalassemydidae, it represents the only definitive member of the family due to the uncertain relationships of other members of Thalassochelydia, primarily due to the lack of cranial material in Thalassemys.
