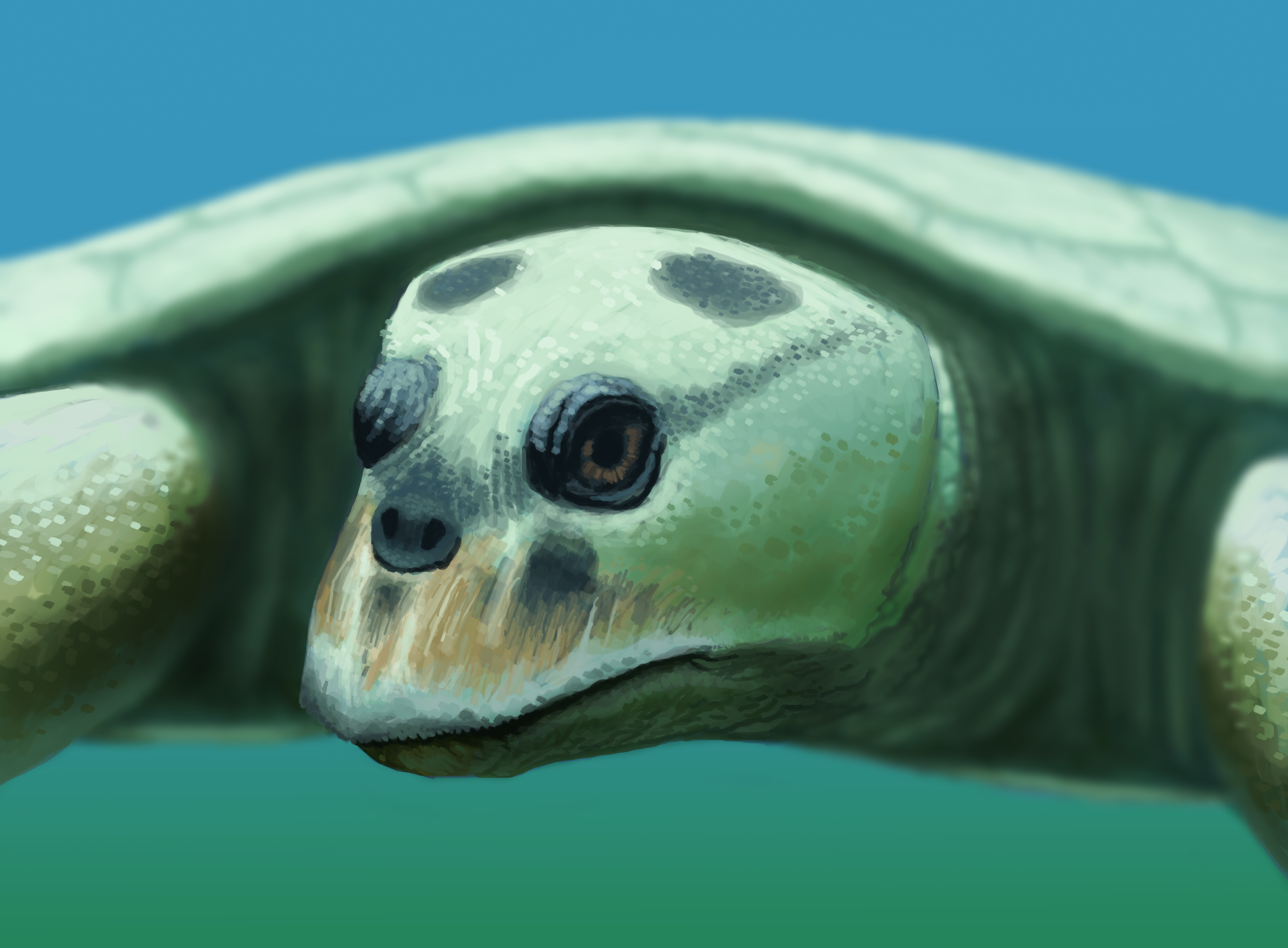
- Life restoration

Scientific classification
- Domain: Eukaryota
- Kingdom: Animalia
- Phylum: Chordata
- Class: Reptilia
- Clade: Pantestudines
- Clade: Testudinata
- Clade: †Thalassochelydia
- Genus: †Owadowia; Szczygielski et al., 2017
- Species: †O. borsukbialynickae

Binomial name
- †Owadowia borsukbialynickae Szczygielski et al., 2017

= Owadowia =

Owadowia Temporal range: Tithonian

Genus of turtles

Owadowia is a genus of extinct thalassochelydian turtle from the Late Jurassic of Poland. The type and only species is Owadowia borsukbialynickae, named by Szczygielski and colleagues in 2017 for a partial lower jaw, coracoid, ilium and femur from the early Tithonian Kcynia Formation. The limited material means that it is difficult to compare Owadowia to its relatives, and it may not be a unique taxon. The genus lacks the features diagnostic to its parent clade Thalassochelydia, has similarities to Solnhofia and Portlandemys as well as being a Late Jurassic marine turtle like the remainder of the group.
