= Chelonides =

Chelonides Temporal range: Kimmeridgian

Scientific classification
- Domain: Eukaryota
- Kingdom: Animalia
- Phylum: Chordata
- Class: Reptilia
- Clade: Pantestudines
- Clade: Testudinata
- Clade: †Thalassochelydia
- Family: †Eurysternidae
- Genus: †Chelonides; Maack, 1869

Type species
- Chelonides wittei Maack, 1869

Extinct genus of turtles

Chelonides is a genus of late Jurassic turtle from marine deposits in Lower Saxony, Germany.

== Taxonomy ==
The name Chelonides wittei was coined by Maack (1869) for a partial shell (GZG 773–1) a partial skull (GZG 773–2), and isolated shell and girdle elements (GZG 773–3 to 773–17) from Hannover, northwestern Germany. Later, Portis (1878) erected a second species, C. robusta, for elements of the shell (GZG 769–11 to 769–19). Hay (1905) considered Chelonides preoccupied without comment and erected Anaphotidemys as a replacement. Kuhn (1964) mistakenly considered the genus preoccupied by Chelonides Boisduval, 1840, a tribe of nocturnal lepidopterans. In their overview of Upper Jurassic and Early Cretaceous turtles from northwestern Germany, Karl et al. (2007) treated the two nominal Chelonides species as synonymous with the plesiochelyid Plesiochelys without justification. A 2017 overview of thalassochelydians, however, indicates that Chelonides is a valid genus of eurysternid, although, C. robusta is a nomen dubium.
