= Euryaspis =

Euryaspis Temporal range: Tithonian

Scientific classification
- Domain: Eukaryota
- Kingdom: Animalia
- Phylum: Chordata
- Class: Reptilia
- Clade: Pantestudines
- Clade: Testudinata
- Clade: †Thalassochelydia
- Genus: †Euryaspis; Wagner, 1861
- Species: †E. radians

Binomial name
- †Euryaspis radians Meyer, 1843

Genus of turtles

Euryaspis is a dubious genus of extinct thalassochelydian turtle from the Late Jurassic of Germany. The type and only species is Euryaspis radians, originally proposed by Wagner in 1859 before being validly described and illustrated in 1861. The only specimen was a partial carapace probably from the Tithonian, although the original locality is unknown. The genus is referred to Thalassochelydia and has been considered a synonym of Eurysternum or Acichelys before, but casts that remain of the lost holotype show that it bears no features that can clarify its validity making it a nomen dubium.
