= Globochelus =

Globochelus Temporal range: Kimmeridgian

Scientific classification
- Kingdom: Animalia
- Phylum: Chordata
- Class: Reptilia
- Clade: Pantestudines
- Clade: Testudinata
- Clade: †Thalassochelydia
- Family: †Plesiochelyidae
- Genus: †Globochelus; De Lapparent de Bloin et al., 2021

Globochelus is an extinct genus of plesiochelyid turtle that inhabited France during the Kimmeridgian stage of the Late Jurassic epoch. It is known from a single species, G. lennieri.
