= Hylaeochelys =

Hylaeochelys Temporal range: Late Jurassic-Early Cretaceous, Tithonian–Berriasian

Scientific classification
- Kingdom: Animalia
- Phylum: Chordata
- Class: Reptilia
- Clade: Pantestudines
- Clade: Testudinata
- Clade: †Thalassochelydia
- Family: †Plesiochelyidae
- Genus: †Hylaeochelys; Lydekker, 1889

Type species
- †Pleurosternon latiscutatum Owen, 1853

Species
- †H. latiscutata (Owen, 1853); †H. belli (Mantell, 1844); †H. kappa Pérez-García & Ortega, 2014

Synonyms
- Archaeochelys? Bergounioux, 1938; Chelone belli Mantell, 1844; Hylaeochelys emarginata Lydekker, 1899 (Owen, 1853); Plastremys lata Owen, 1881; Pleurosternon emarginatum Owen, 1853; Pleurosternon koeneni Grabbe, 1884; Pleurosternon latiscutatum Owen, 1853

Extinct genus of turtles

Hylaeochelys is an extinct genus of plesiochelyid turtle that lived during the Late Jurassic-Early Cretaceous in Portugal, Spain, France, and southern England. The type species was originally named by Richard Owen as Pleurosternon latiscutatum in 1853, before being moved to the new genus Hylaeochelys by Richard Lydekker in 1889. Other species included in the genus are H. belli, H. kappa and H. lata, originally named under different genera by Gideon Mantell and Owen, respectively. All species are represented by carapaces, primarily from the Lulworth Formation of the Purbeck Limestone Group that was deposited during the Berriasian.
