= Cromer Knoll Group =

Geological group

- Stratigraphic range: Lower Cretaceous
- Type: Group
- Sub-units: Speeton Clay, Hunstanton Formation, Spilsby Sandstone (onshore UK); Valhall Formation, Carrack Formation, Rødby Formation (UK Central and Northern North Sea); Valhall Formation, Carrack Formation, Red Chalk (UK Southern North Sea); Åsgard Formation, Tuxen Formation, Mime Formation, Sola Formation, Rødby Formation, Agat Formation (Norwegian North Sea); Lyr Formation, Lange Formation, Lysing Formation (Norwegian Sea); Valhall Formation, Tuxen Formation, Sola Formation, Rødby Formation (Danish Central Graben)
- Underlies: Chalk Group (onshore UK and UK North Sea); Shetland Group (UK North Sea, Norwegian North Sea, Norwegian Sea)
- Overlies: Ancholme Group (onshore UK), Kimmeridge Clay Formation (UK North Sea), Draupne Formation, Mandal Formation, Flekkefjord Formation (Norwegian North Sea), Farsund Formation (Danish Central Graben)
- Thickness: >700 m (6506/12-4 well); >1370 m (210/15b-4 well)

Lithology
- Primary: Mudstone, calcareous mudstone
- Other: Limestone, siltstone, sandstone

Location
- Region: England, North Sea, Norwegian Sea
- Country: United Kingdom, Norway, Denmark
- Extent: North Sea, Norwegian Sea

Type section
- Named for: Cromer Knoll buoy
- Named by: Rhys (1974)

The Cromer Knoll Group is a geological group of Early Cretaceous age, found at outcrop in eastern England and developed extensively beneath the North Sea in the UK, Norwegian and Danish sectors and in the Norwegian Sea. It preserves fossils dating back to the Early Cretaceous period.

== Distribution ==
The Cromer Knoll Group is recognised locally onshore Eastern England and over a wide area of the North Sea and Norwegian sea. In the Southern North Sea it is found throughout the UK sector and the Danish Central Graben. In the Netherlands sector the equivalent unit is the Rijnland Group.

== See also ==
- List of fossiliferous stratigraphic units in England
