= Hunstanton Formation =

Geological formation in England

- Stratigraphic range: Albian to Cenomanian (Cretaceous)
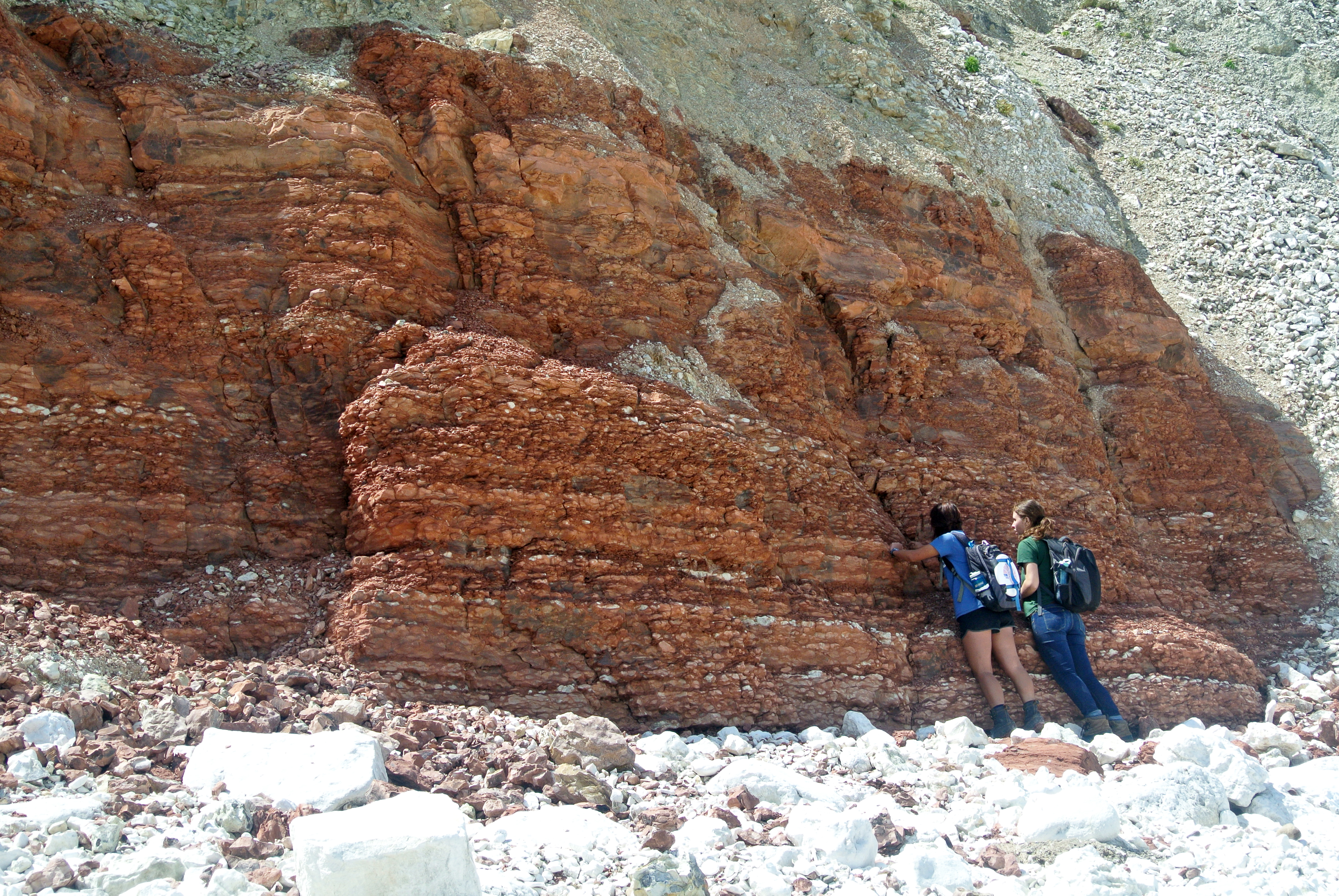
- Hunstanton Formation ("Red Chalk") exposed in south Filey Bay, North Yorkshire
- Type: Formation
- Unit of: Cromer Knoll Group
- Underlies: Chalk Group
- Overlies: Carstone Formation, Speeton Clay Formation
- Thickness: 1–30 m

Lithology
- Primary: chalk
- Other: marl

Location
- Country: England
- Extent: north Norfolk, Lincolnshire, Yorkshire

Type section
- Named for: Hunstanton

The Hunstanton Formation is a lithostratigraphic name applied to an early Cretaceous limestone succession in eastern England which was formerly known as Red Chalk. The type section is at Hunstanton Cliff in northwest Norfolk.
