= Pelobatochelys =

Pelobatochelys Temporal range: Kimmeridgian

Scientific classification
- Kingdom: Animalia
- Phylum: Chordata
- Class: Reptilia
- Clade: Pantestudines
- Clade: Testudinata
- Clade: †Thalassochelydia
- Genus: †Pelobatochelys; Seeley, 1875
- Species: †P. blakii

Binomial name
- †Pelobatochelys blakii Seeley, 1875

Synonyms
- Tropidemys blakii (Seeley, 1875) Pérez-García, 2015

Extinct genus of turtles

Pelobatochelys is a genus of extinct thalassochelydian turtle from the Late Jurassic of the United Kingdom. The type and only species is Pelobatochelys blakii, named by Harry Govier Seeley in 1875 for a central carapace fragment (designated as lectotype) along with five additional specimens from the remainder of the shell from the early Kimmeridgian of the Kimmeridge Clay in Dorset, and additional material from the Kimmeridge Clay has also been referred to the taxon. The material was considered to be related to various turtles throughout time, including being reassigned to Tropidemys as T. blakii based on limited evidence. A large shell also from Weymouth, Dorset may represent further material of Pelobatochelys, but could also be from Tropidemys langii which was also present in the deposits.
