= Kimmeridge Clay =

Geological formation in England

- Stratigraphic range: Kimmeridgian–Berriasian
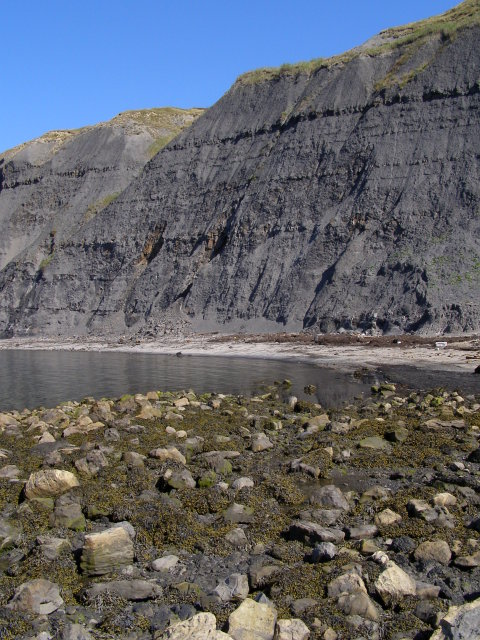
- Grey cliffs of Upper Kimmeridge Clay above the beach at Egmont Bight
- Type: Geological formation
- Unit of: Ancholme Group (onshore), Humber Group (offshore)
- Sub-units: Birch Sandstone Member; Burns Sandstone Member; Claymore Sandstone Member; Dirk Sandstone Member; Magnus Sandstone Member; Ptarmigan Sandstone Member; Ribble Sandstone Member
- Underlies: Portland Sand Formation, Speeton Clay Formation, Spilsby Sandstone
- Overlies: Ampthill Clay, Corallian Group

Lithology
- Primary: Mudstone
- Other: Siltstone, Sandstone, Conglomerate

Location
- Region: England (surface); North Sea (subsurface)
- Country: United Kingdom

Type section
- Named for: Kimmeridge Bay
- Location: Type section - North Sea well 47/15- 1 at 885-919 m depth Type area - coastal outcrops from Black Head, Weymouth to Chapman's Pool

The Kimmeridge Clay is a sedimentary deposit of fossiliferous marine clay which is of Late Jurassic to lowermost Cretaceous age and occurs in southern and eastern England and in the North Sea. This rock formation is the major source rock for North Sea oil. The fossil fauna of the Kimmeridge Clay includes turtles, thalattosuchians, sauropods, plesiosaurs, pliosaurs and ichthyosaurs, as well as a number of invertebrate species.

== Description ==
Kimmeridge Clay is named after the village of Kimmeridge on the Dorset coast of England, where it is well exposed and forms part of the Jurassic Coast World Heritage Site. Onshore, it is of Late Jurassic (Kimmeridgian) age and outcrops across England, in a band stretching from Dorset in the south-west, north-east to North Yorkshire. Offshore, it extends into the Lower Cretaceous (Berriasian Stage) and it is found throughout the Southern, Central and Northern North Sea.

The Kimmeridge Clay crops out in an somewhat interrupted band from Dorset to Lincolnshire. Further northeast, beneath the North Sea, where it attains a huge thickness, it is the source for much of the North Sea Oil. The characteristics that make this formation a rich oil source are present in Buckinghamshire too - a high fossil organic component, although it has not been subjected to sufficient temperature to yield any hydrocarbon.

The foundations of the Humber Bridge on the southern (Barton) side of the bridge are on Kimmeridge Clay beneath superficial deposits, under the Humber estuary.

== Economic importance ==
Kimmeridge Clay is of great economic importance, being the major source rock for oil fields in the North Sea hydrocarbon province. It has distinctive physical properties and log responses.

== Vertebrate fauna ==
Color key: Taxon / Reclassified taxon / Taxon falsely reported as present / Dubious taxon or junior synonym / Ichnotaxon / Ootaxon / Morphotaxon	Notes; Uncertain or tentative taxa are in small text; ~~crossed out~~ taxa are discredited.

Fauna uncovered from the Kimmeridge Clay include:

=== Ray-finned fish ===
Ray-finned fishes of the Kimmeridge clay Formation
Genus	Species	Location	Stratigraphic Position	Abundance	Notes	Images
Thrissops	T. kimmeridgensis	Isle of Purbeck, Dorset		Most common Kimmeridge clay fish, known from several complete specimens	Housed at the Etches Collection, discovered by Steve Etches. Most prominently distinguished from other species of the Genus by the irregular size of its dentary teeth.	Complete specimen
Pachythrissops	Indeterminate	Dorset			Housed at the Etches Collection, discovered by Steve Etches	
Allothrissops	Indeterminate	Dorset			Housed at the Etches Collection, discovered by Steve Etches	
Chondrostei	Indeterminate	Dorset		One specimen, a fin	Housed at the Etches Collection, discovered by Steve Etches	
Lepidotes	Indeterminate	Dorset			Housed at the Etches Collection, discovered by Steve Etches	
Gyrodus	Indeterminate	Dorset			Housed at the Etches Collection, discovered by Steve Etches	
Caturus	Indeterminate	Dorset			Housed at the Etches Collection, discovered by Steve Etches	Caturus furcatus
Aspidorhynchus	Indeterminate	Dorset			Housed at the Etches Collection, discovered by Steve Etches	
Hypsocormus	H.tenuirostris	Dorset		Rare	Housed at the Etches Collection, discovered by Steve Etches	
Pachycormus	Indeterminate	Dorset		Rare	Housed at the Etches Collection, discovered by Steve Etches	
Eurycormus	Indeterminate	Dorset		Rare, one complete specimen	Housed at the Etches Collection, discovered by Steve Etches	
Leptolepidae	Indeterminate	Dorset		Fairly common, multiple near complete specimens.	Housed at the Etches Collection, discovered by Steve Etches	

=== Lobe-finned fish ===
Lobe-finned fishes of the Kimmeridge clay Formation
Genus	Species	Location	Stratigraphic Position	Abundance	Notes	Images
Holophagus	Indeterminate	Dorset		One specimen, cranial material	Coelacanth. Housed at the Etches Collection, discovered by Steve Etches. More than 2 metres long	

=== Cartilaginous fish ===
Cartilaginous fishes of the Kimmeridge clay Formation
Genus	Species	Location	Stratigraphic Position	Abundance	Notes	Images
Asteracanthus	Indeterminate	Dorset		Known from many dorsal spines	Housed at the Etches Collection, discovered by Steve Etches	
Chimaera	Indeterminate	Dorset		Known from many dorsal spines	Housed at the Etches Collection, discovered by Steve Etches	
Hybodus	Indeterminate	Dorset		Known from many dorsal spines, perhaps a complete head	Housed at the Etches Collection, discovered by Steve Etches	
Ischyodus	Indeterminate	Dorset		One specimen	Housed at the Etches Collection, discovered by Steve Etches	
Rhinobatidae	Indeterminate	Dorset		Known from a complete specimen, and other isolated remains	Housed at the Etches Collection, discovered by Steve Etches	
Kimmerobatis	K. etchesi	Dorset	Encombe (holotype) and Rope Lake Head (paratype)	Known from two partial skeletons	An asterodermid ray; housed at the Etches Collection, discovered by Steve Etches	
Durnonovariaodus	D. maiseyi	Dorset	Pectinatites pectinatus ammonite zone	One partial skeleton	A hybodontid	

=== Turtles ===
Turtles of the Kimmeridge clay Formation
Genus	Species	Location	Stratigraphic Position	Abundance	Notes	Images
Craspedochelys	C. passmorei	Swindon		"NHMUK R5871 (holotype), subcomplete shell with associated postcranial remains, including parts of the girdles, the left humerus, and partial cervical vertebrae"	Thalassochelydian sea turtle	
Achelonia	A. formosa	Ely, Cambridgeshire		"CAMSM J29898 to CAMSM J29955 (holotype), a partial, disarticulated skeleton"	Thalassochelydian sea turtle, formerly considered the distinct species "Enaliochelys chelonia"	
Pelobatochelys	P. blakii	Weymouth		Carapace fragments	Thalassochelydian sea turtle	
Plesiochelys	P. etalloni			"basicranium with partial otic chambers and fragment of the right maxilla"	Thalassochelydian sea turtle	
Thalassemys	T. bruntrutana, T. hugii	Isle of Purbeck (bruntrutana), Abingdon, Oxfordshire (hugii)		"A partial carapace and associated limb and girdle elements (NHMUK R8699)" (Purbeck) "A large shell (OUMNH J.66966)" (Oxfordshire)	Thalassochelydian sea turtle	
Tropidemys	P. langii	Weymouth		"NHMUK OR44178b, an isolated neural; NHMUK OR45920, right costals 1–3; NHMUK OR45921, a left first costal; NHMUK R2733, a left fourth costal"	Thalassochelydian sea turtle	

=== Archosaurs ===
==== Thalattosuchians ====
Genus	Species	Location	Member	Abundance	Notes	Images
Bathysuchus	B. megarhinus				A pelagic teleosaurid.	Cricosaurus Dakosaurus Plesiosuchus Torvoneustes
Cricosaurus	C. gracilis				A metriorhynchine metriorhynchid	Cricosaurus Dakosaurus Plesiosuchus Torvoneustes
Dakosaurus	D. maximus				A geosaurine metriorhynchid	Cricosaurus Dakosaurus Plesiosuchus Torvoneustes
Metriorhynchus	M. brevirostris				A metriorhynchine metriorhynchid	Cricosaurus Dakosaurus Plesiosuchus Torvoneustes
Plesiosuchus	P. manseli				A geosaurine metriorhynchid	Cricosaurus Dakosaurus Plesiosuchus Torvoneustes
Torvoneustes	T. carpenteri				A geosaurine metriorhynchid	Cricosaurus Dakosaurus Plesiosuchus Torvoneustes
Torvoneustes	T. coryphaeus				A geosaurine metriorhynchid	Cricosaurus Dakosaurus Plesiosuchus Torvoneustes
Machimosaurus	M. sp				Teleosauroid.	Cricosaurus Dakosaurus Plesiosuchus Torvoneustes

==== Ornithischians ====
Indeterminate ankylosaur osteoderms have been found in Wiltshire, England. Indeterminate stegosaurid remains have been found in Dorset and Wiltshire, England.

Genus	Species	Location	Member	Abundance	Notes	Images
Cumnoria	C. prestwichii	Oxfordshire		"Fragmentary skull and skeleton."	Iguanodontian	Cumnoria Dacentrurus
Dacentrurus	D. armatus	Cambridgeshire; Dorset; Wiltshire		vertebrae, a massive right femur (thigh bone), ribs and a near complete pelvis.	Stegosaur. Wiltshire remains include specimens previously referred to Omosaurus armatus and O. hastiger.	Cumnoria Dacentrurus
Ornithopoda	Indeterminate	Dorset?			Kimmeridge clay remains considered to represent a possible close relative of Bugenasaura are now regarded as the remains of an indeterminate euornithopod.(The specimen may have had its locality and horizon mislabelled.)	Cumnoria Dacentrurus
Omosaurus	O.armatus	Wiltshire		Reclassified as Dacentrurus armatus because the generic name Omosaurus was preoccupied.		Cumnoria Dacentrurus
Omosaurus	O. hastiger	Wiltshire				Cumnoria Dacentrurus

==== Saurischians ====
Indeterminate ornithomimmid remains have been found in Dorset, England. An undescribed theropod genus was found in Dorset.

Genus	Species	Location	Stratigraphic position	Material	Notes	Images
Bothriospondylus	B. suffosus	Wiltshire		"[Seven] dorsal and sacral centra."	Considered a nomen dubium.	Juratyrant
Cetiosaurus	C. humerocristatus	Dorset			Now Duriatitan.	Juratyrant
Cetiosaurus	Indeterminate	Oxfordshire			Remains previously referred to an indeterminate species of Cetiosaurus are now regarded as indeterminate sauropod material.	Juratyrant
Duriatitan	D. humerocristatus	Dorset		Humerus	A titanosauriform	Juratyrant
Gigantosaurus	G. megalonyx	Cambridgeshire			Remains previously referred to Gigantosaurus megalonyx are now regarded as indeterminate sauropod material.	Juratyrant
"Ischyrosaurus"	I. manseli	Oxfordshire		"Humerus."	Remains previously referred to Ischyrosaurus manseli are now regarded as indeterminate sauropod material.	Juratyrant
Juratyrant	J. langhami	Dorset		Partial skeleton	A primitive tyrannosaur	Juratyrant
Torvosaurus	Indeterminate	Swindon, Dorset		Tibia (OUMNH J.29886) and maxilla fragment, collected separately	A megalosaurid	Juratyrant
Theropoda	Indeterminate	Wiltshire; Dorset		A tooth from Foxhangers, Wiltshire (NHMUK 46388), phalanges from an unspecified locality in Wiltshire (DZSWS 3009), and a proximal caudal vertebra from Shotover, Oxfordshire (OUMNH J.47134).	Remains previously referred to Megalosaurus are now regarded as indeterminate theropod material.	Juratyrant
Sauropoda	Indeterminate	Oxfordshire; Cambridgeshire; Norfolk			Remains previously attributed to one or more indeterminate species of Ornithopsis (incl. O. leedsii) are now regarded as possible indeterminate sauropod material.	Juratyrant

==== Pterosaurs ====
Genus	Species	Location	Material	Notes	Images
Cuspicephalus	C. scarfi	Dorset	Partial Skull	Missing Crest, lower jaw and dentition	Cuspicephalus Rhamphorhynchus
Germanodactylus	indeterminate	Charnel, Dorset		May be a non-pterodactyloid monofenestratan instead	Cuspicephalus Rhamphorhynchus
Rhamphorhynchus	R. etchesi	Encombe, Dorset			Cuspicephalus Rhamphorhynchus
Ctenochasmatoidea	indeterminate	Abingdon, Oxfordshire	Left first wing finger phalanx		Cuspicephalus Rhamphorhynchus

=== Plesiosaurs ===
Genus	Species	Location	Member	Abundance	Notes	Images
Bathyspondylus	B. swindoniensis				Plesiosaur of unknown affinities	Kimmerosaurus Pliosaurus brachydeirus
Colymbosaurus	C. megadeirus				A cryptoclidid	Kimmerosaurus Pliosaurus brachydeirus
Colymbosaurus	C. trochantericus				Nomen dubium	Kimmerosaurus Pliosaurus brachydeirus
Kimmerosaurus	K. langhami				A cryptoclidid	Kimmerosaurus Pliosaurus brachydeirus
Plesiosaurus	"P." manseli				Distinct from Colymbosaurus.	Kimmerosaurus Pliosaurus brachydeirus
Pliosaurus	P. brachydeirus				A thalassophonean pliosaurid	Kimmerosaurus Pliosaurus brachydeirus
Pliosaurus	P. brachyspondylus				Nomen dubium	Kimmerosaurus Pliosaurus brachydeirus
Pliosaurus	P. carpenteri				A thalassophonean pliosaurid	Kimmerosaurus Pliosaurus brachydeirus
Pliosaurus	P. kevani				A thalassophonean pliosaurid	Kimmerosaurus Pliosaurus brachydeirus
Pliosaurus	P. portentificus				A nomen dubium	Kimmerosaurus Pliosaurus brachydeirus
Pliosaurus	P. ?rossicus				A thalassophonean pliosaurid; taxonomic identification of specimens tentative	Kimmerosaurus Pliosaurus brachydeirus
Pliosaurus	P. westburyensis				A thalassophonean pliosaurid	Kimmerosaurus Pliosaurus brachydeirus
Pliosaurus	P. sp. 1			Partial skeleton, CAMSM J.35991	A thalassophonean pliosaurid; previously assigned to the nomen dubium P. brachyspondylus	Kimmerosaurus Pliosaurus brachydeirus
Pliosaurus	P. sp. 2			Mandible, NHMUK PV OR 39362	A thalassophonean pliosaurid; previously assigned to the nomen dubium P. macromerus	Kimmerosaurus Pliosaurus brachydeirus
Spitrasaurus	Indeterminate					Kimmerosaurus Pliosaurus brachydeirus

=== Ichthyosaurs ===
Genus	Species	Location	Stratigraphic Position	Abundance	Notes	Images
Brachypterygius	B.extremus	Dorset				Brachypterygius Grendelius Nannopterygius Thalassodraco Ophthalmosaurus
Grendelius	G.mordax	Dorset				Brachypterygius Grendelius Nannopterygius Thalassodraco Ophthalmosaurus
Ichthyosauridae	Indeterminate	Dorset			Giant, near complete specimen. Proposed to have been 6 metres long when complete. Housed at the Etches Collection in Dorset.	Brachypterygius Grendelius Nannopterygius Thalassodraco Ophthalmosaurus
Macropterygius	M.trigonus	Dorset			Nomen dubium - classified by a single vertebra	Brachypterygius Grendelius Nannopterygius Thalassodraco Ophthalmosaurus
Nannopterygius	N.enthekiodon	Dorset				Brachypterygius Grendelius Nannopterygius Thalassodraco Ophthalmosaurus
Thalassodraco	T. etchesi	Dorset	The Pectinatites pectinatus ammonite zone			Brachypterygius Grendelius Nannopterygius Thalassodraco Ophthalmosaurus
Ophthalmosaurus	Indeterminate	Dorset				Brachypterygius Grendelius Nannopterygius Thalassodraco Ophthalmosaurus

== Invertebrates ==
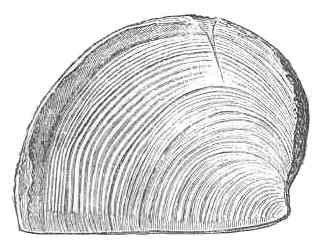
An aptychus with the name Trigonellites latus, from the Kimmeridge Clay Formation

The invertebrate fauna of the Kimmeridge Clay includes:

- Mollusca:
  - Cardium striatulum
  - Ostrea deltoidea
  - Gryphaea (Exogyra) virgula
  - Trigonellites
  - Belemnotheutis
  - Etchesia
- Arthropoda:
  - Phlyctosoma sp.
  - Eryma sp.
  - Magila latimana
  - Mecochirus sp.
  - Archaeolepas redtenbacheri

== See also ==
- List of dinosaur-bearing rock formations
