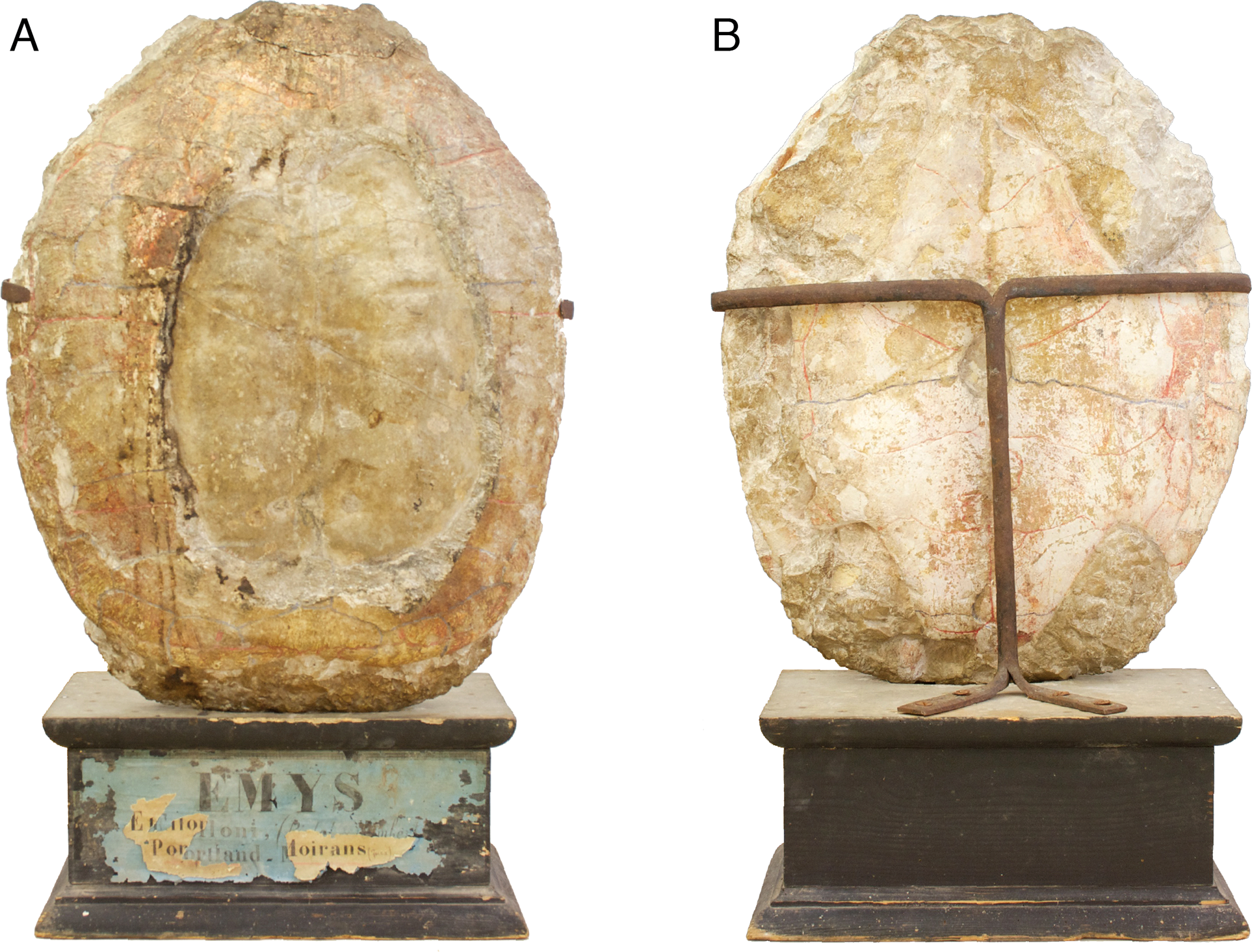
- Holotype carapace and plastron of Plesiochelys etalloni (previously Emy etalloni). Mount is situated upside-down.

Scientific classification
- Kingdom: Animalia
- Phylum: Chordata
- Class: Reptilia
- Clade: Pantestudines
- Clade: Testudinata
- Clade: †Thalassochelydia
- Family: †Plesiochelyidae; Baur, 1888

Genera
- †Craspedochelys; †Globochelus; †Plesiochelys; †Portlandemys; †Tropidemys; †Hylaeochelys

= Plesiochelyidae =

Plesiochelyidae Temporal range: Late Jurassic, Oxfordian–Tithonian

Extinct family of turtles

The Plesiochelyidae are an extinct family of turtles in the clade Thalassochelydia originally classified within the Cryptodira suborder, mostly belonging from the Jurassic period. An alternate study placed the clade Thalassochelydia in the Angolachelonia and outside the Testudines.

== Palaeoecology ==
Phosphatic δ^{18}O values indicate that plesiochelyids were inhabitants of coastal marine environments.
