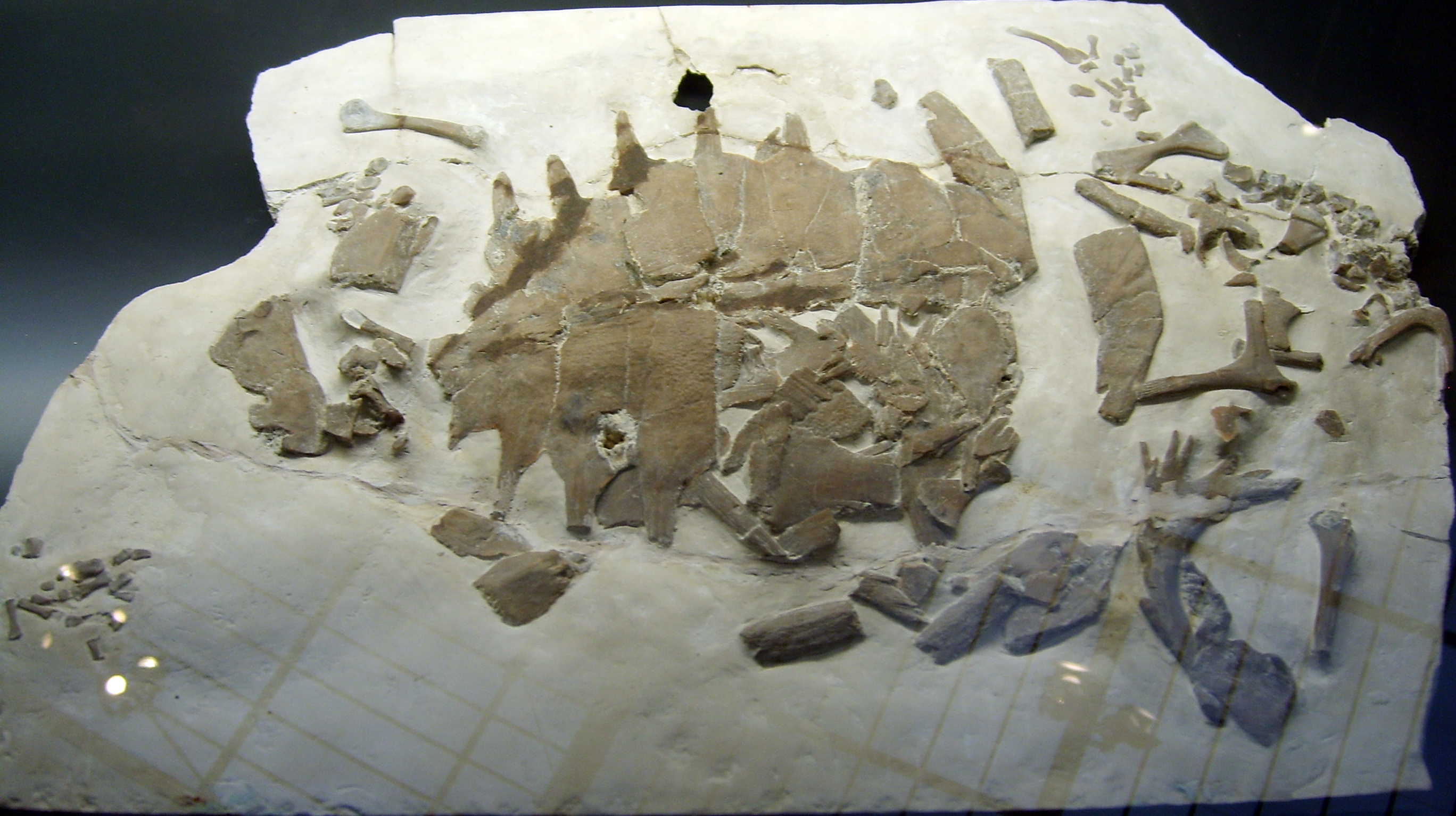

Scientific classification
- Domain: Eukaryota
- Kingdom: Animalia
- Phylum: Chordata
- Class: Reptilia
- Clade: Pantestudines
- Clade: Testudinata
- Clade: †Thalassochelydia
- Family: †Eurysternidae; Dollo, 1886

Genera
- Achelonia; Chelonides; Eurysternum; Hydropelta; Idiochelys; Palaeomedusa; Parachelys; Solnhofia

= Eurysternidae =

Eurysternidae Temporal range: Kimmeridgian–Tithonian

Extinct family of turtles

Eurysternidae is an extinct family of turtles in the clade Thalassochelydia. It consists of several genera of marine turtles from marine deposits in Europe, including Achelonia, Chelonides, Eurysternum. Hydropelta, Chelonides, Idiochelys, Palaeomedusa, Parachelys. and Solnhofia.
