= Spilsby Sandstone =

- Stratigraphic range: Tithonian–Valanginian
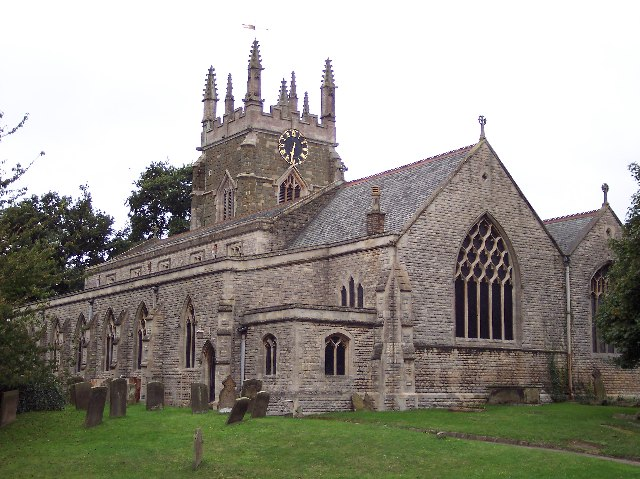
- St. James, Spilsby, Lincs; built from Spilsby Sandstone
- Type: Formation
- Unit of: Cromer Knoll Group
- Sub-units: Upper, Lower Spilsby Sandstone Members
- Underlies: Claxby Ironstone
- Overlies: Kimmeridge Clay Formation
- Thickness: To c.24m

Lithology
- Primary: Sandstone

Location
- Region: England
- Country: United Kingdom
- Extent: Onshore: South Lincolnshire Offshore: Wash, North Sea

The Spilsby Sandstone is a geologic formation in England. It preserves fossils dating back to the Cretaceous period.

== See also ==
- List of fossiliferous stratigraphic units in England
