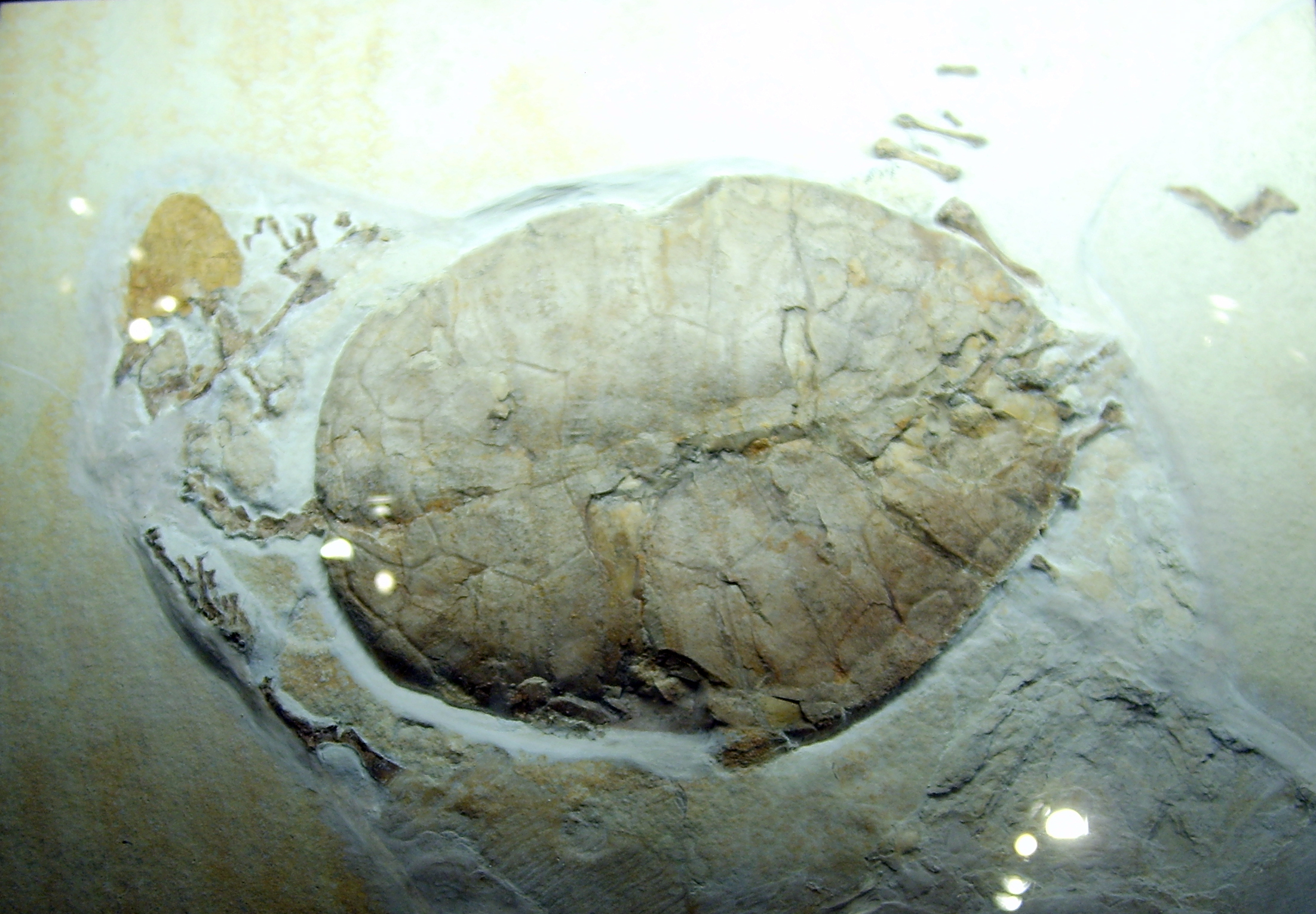
- Palaeomedusa testa fossil at the Museum für Naturkunde, Berlin.

Scientific classification
- Domain: Eukaryota
- Kingdom: Animalia
- Phylum: Chordata
- Class: Reptilia
- Clade: Pantestudines
- Clade: Testudinata
- Clade: †Thalassochelydia
- Family: †Thalassemydidae
- Genus: †Palaeomedusa
- Species: †P. testa

Binomial name
- †Palaeomedusa testa Meyer, 1860

Synonyms
- Eurysternum crassipes Wagner 1859

= Palaeomedusa =

Palaeomedusa Temporal range: Late Jurassic, Tithonian

Extinct genus of turtles

Palaeomedusa testa is an extinct species of thalassochelydian turtle from the Tithonian of the Late Jurassic (145.5 to 150.8 million years ago). It was first described by the German palaeontologist Christian Erich Hermann von Meyer in 1860. It is the only species classified under the genus Palaeomedusa.

== See also ==
- Thalassemys
