= Claxby Ironstone =

Geological formation in England

- Stratigraphic range: Valanginian–Hauterivian
- Type: Formation
- Underlies: Tealby Formation
- Overlies: Spilsby Sandstone
- Thickness: Up to 8 m

Lithology
- Primary: Clay
- Other: Silt, ironstone

Location
- Region: England
- Country: United Kingdom
- Extent: The Wash, southern Lincolnshire

The Claxby Ironstone is a geological formation in England. It preserves fossils dating back to the Cretaceous period.

== See also ==
- List of fossiliferous stratigraphic units in England
