= Speeton Clay Formation =

Early Cretaceous geological formation in Yorkshire, England

- Stratigraphic range: Berriasian-Albian 145–100 Ma
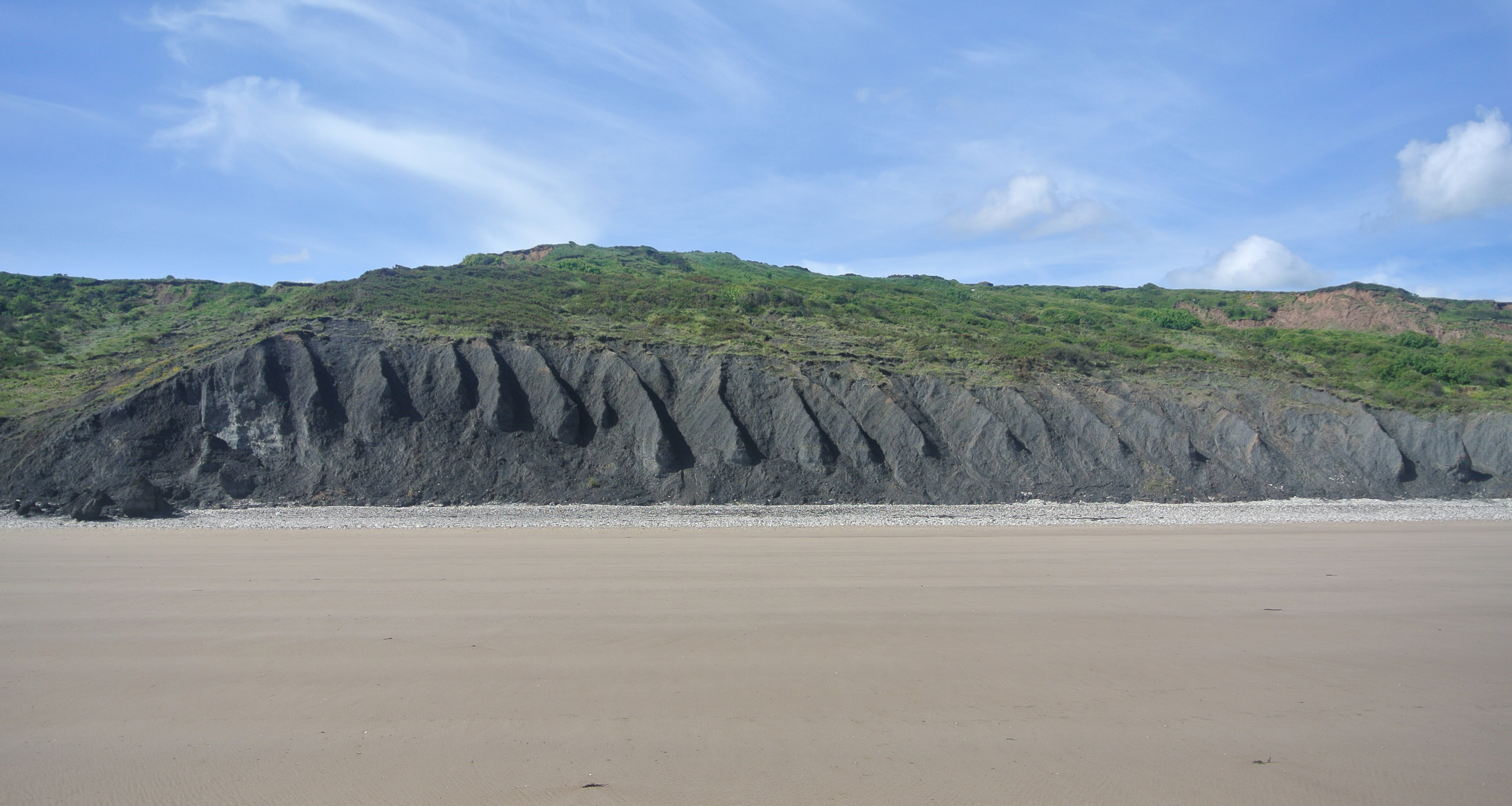
- Speeton Clay Formation at Reighton Sands, North Yorkshire
- Type: Geological formation
- Unit of: Cromer Knoll Group
- Sub-units: Members A to D
- Underlies: Hunstanton Formation
- Overlies: Kimmeridge Clay Formation
- Thickness: 100 m (330 ft) in outcrop

Lithology
- Primary: Claystone
- Other: Glauconite

Location
- Coordinates: 54.2°N 0.2°W
- Approximate paleocoordinates: 41.0°S 9.3°E
- Region: Yorkshire
- Country: United Kingdom
- Extent: North Sea Graben, eastern England

Type section
- Named for: Speeton
- Location of the formation

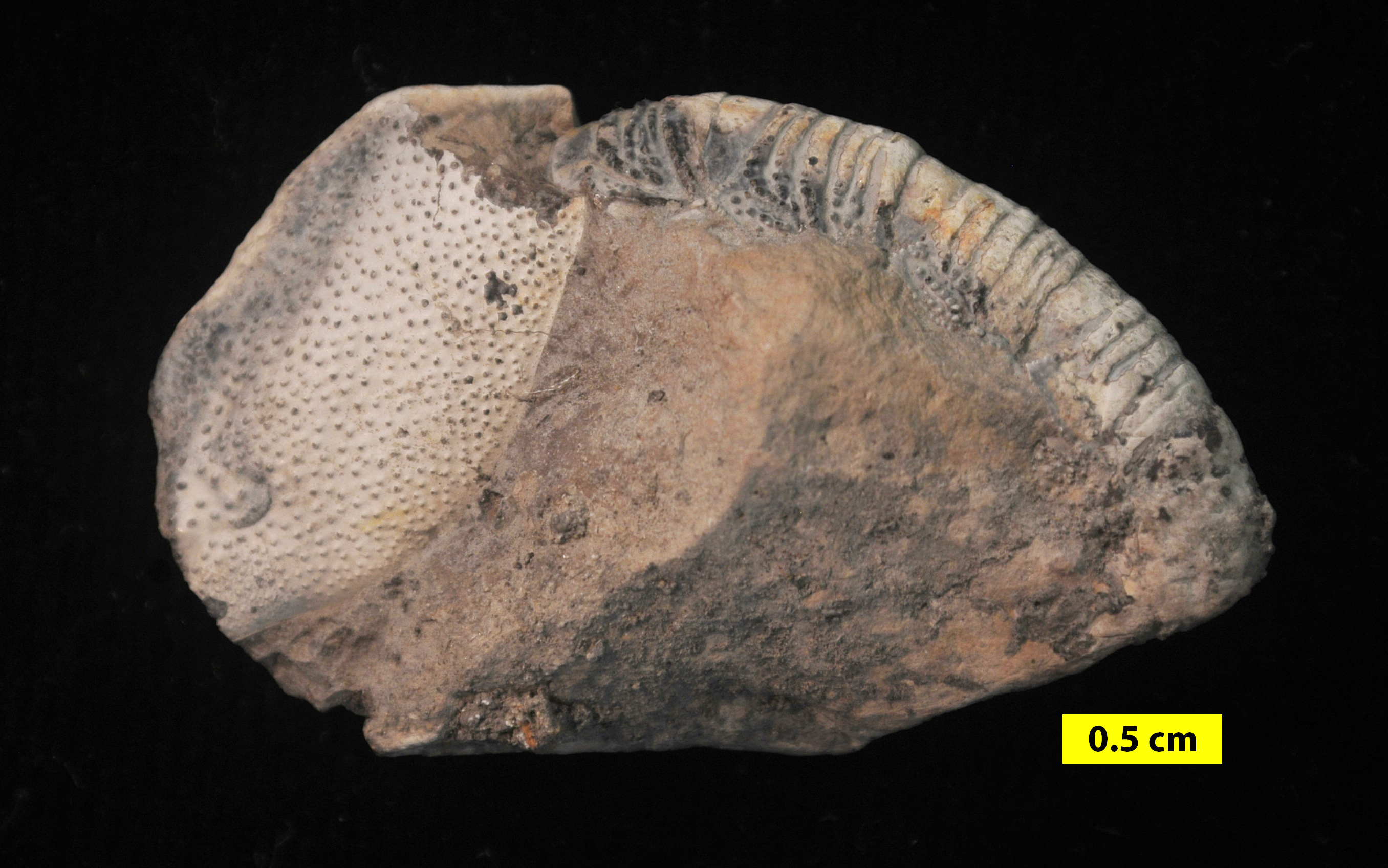
Meyeria ornata, a lobster from the Speeton Clay

The Speeton Clay Formation (SpC) is a Lower Cretaceous geological formation in Yorkshire, northern England. Unlike the contemporaneous terrestrial Wealden Group to the south, the Speeton Clay was deposited in marine conditions. The most common fossils in the unit are belemnites, followed by ammonites and the lobster Meyeria ornata. Dinosaur remains are among the fossils that have been recovered from the formation, although none have yet been referred to a specific genus.

The formation is named after the village of Speeton in North Yorkshire.

== Fossil content ==
The following fossils have been reported from the formation:

- Reptiles
  - Ichthyosaurs
    - Acamptonectes densus
  - Neornithischians
    - Owenodon hoggii
    - Iguanodontia indet.
  - Sauropterygians
    - Elasmosauridae - "Speeton Clay plesiosaurian"
- Fish
  - Cretorectolobus doylei
  - "Dasyatis" speetonensis
  - "Protosqualus. sp"
  - Notidanodon lanceolatus
  - Notorhynchus aptiensis
  - Synechodus dubrisiensis
  - Spathobatis rugosus
  - ?Sphenodus sp.
  - "Elops" neocomiensis
  - Pycnodontidae indet.
  - Semionotidae indet.
  - Teleostei indet.
  - ?Triakidae indet.
- Invertebrates
  - Crustaceans
    - Martillepas auriculum
  - Crinoids
    - Crinoidea indet.

== See also ==
- List of dinosaur-bearing rock formations
  - List of stratigraphic units with indeterminate dinosaur fossils
