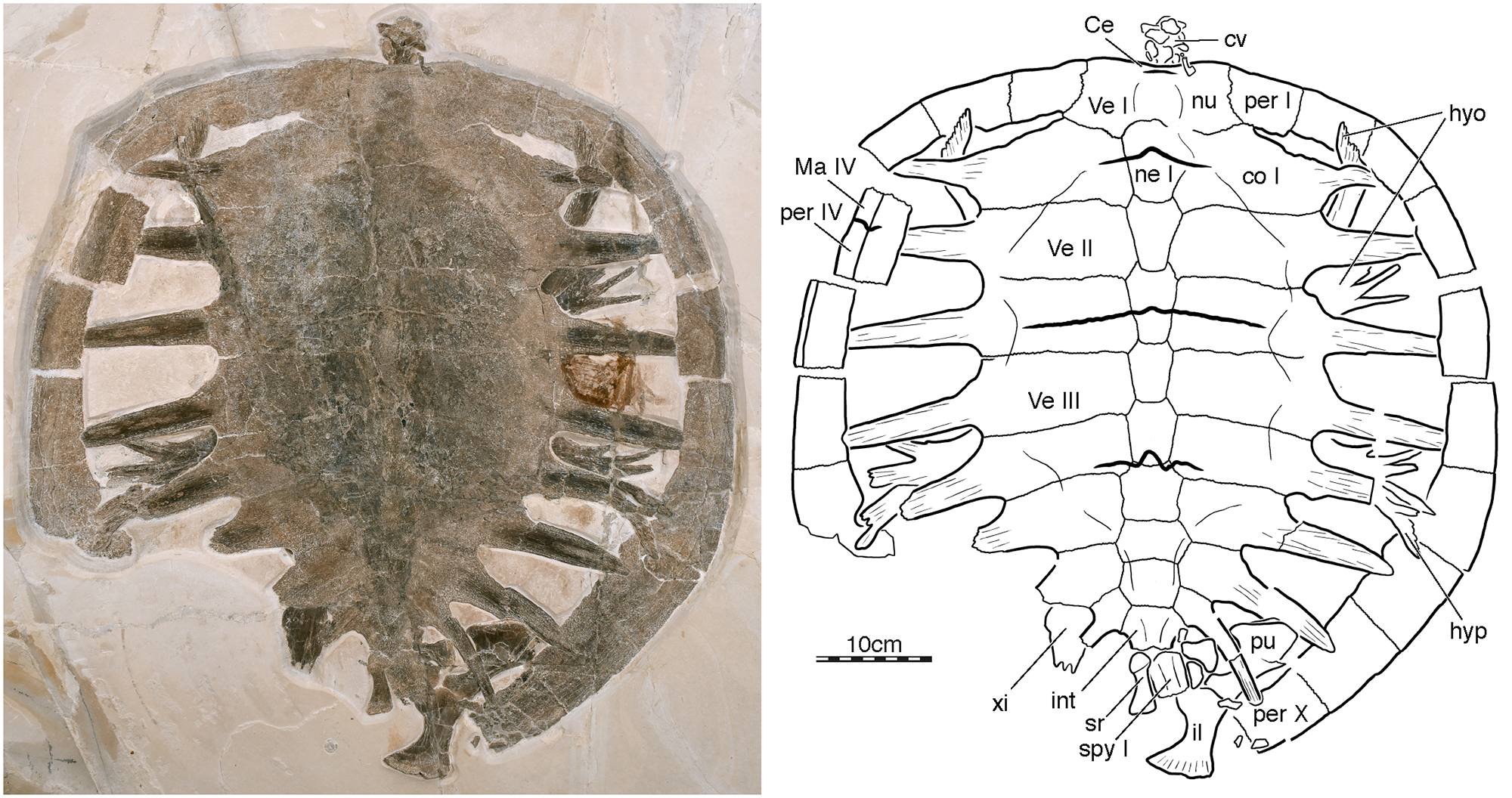
- NKMB Watt15/1, Achelonia formosa, late Kimmeridgian of Wattendorf, Germany.

Scientific classification
- Kingdom: Animalia
- Phylum: Chordata
- Class: Reptilia
- Clade: Pantestudines
- Clade: Testudinata
- Clade: †Thalassochelydia
- Family: †Eurysternidae
- Genus: †Achelonia; Meyer, 1860

Species
- A. formosa Meyer, 1860

Synonyms
- Enaliochelys chelonia Seeley, 1869

= Achelonia =

Achelonia Temporal range: Late Jurassic Kimmeridgian

Extinct genus of turtles

Achelonia is an extinct genus of marine thalassochelydian turtle. Its type species is Achelonia formosa. Fossils are known from the Upper Jurassic (late Kimmeridgian) of Wattendorf, Germany, within Cerin, France, and also in England. Material from England was originally considered to belong to the separate genus Enaliochelys and species Enaliochelys chelonia, named by Harry Govier Seeley in 1869 for a partial disarticulated skeleton from the early Kimmeridgian of the Kimmeridge Clay in Cambridgeshire. The synonymy was recognised in 2020.
