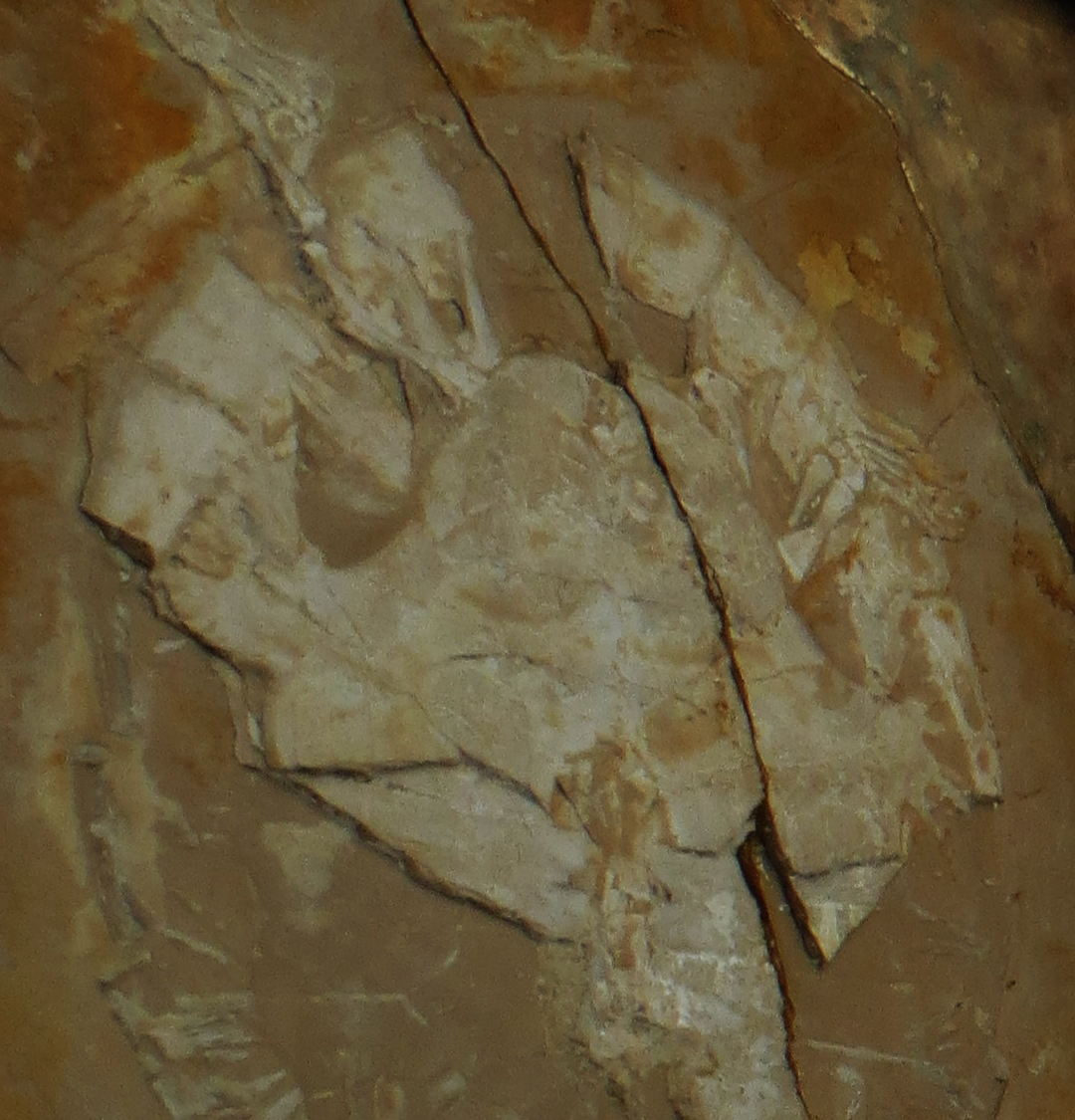
- Fossil

Scientific classification
- Domain: Eukaryota
- Kingdom: Animalia
- Phylum: Chordata
- Class: Reptilia
- Clade: Pantestudines
- Clade: Testudinata
- Clade: †Thalassochelydia
- Family: †Eurysternidae
- Genus: †Idiochelys von Meyer, 1839

Type species
- Idiochelys fitzingeri von Meyer, 1839

= Idiochelys =

Idiochelys Temporal range: Kimmeridgian-Tithonian

Extinct genus of turtles

Idiochelys is a genus of Late Jurassic turtle from marine deposits in the Jura Mountains of eastern France and Bavaria, Germany.

Idiochelys wagneri, Chelonemys plana, and Chelonemys ovata are junior synonyms, the latter two being described from specimens in the Ain Department of southeastern France. Distinguishing features of Idiochelys include an oval/rounded carapace, broad vertebrals, a long tail, and a reduced manual phalangeal formula (2-2-3-3-3).
