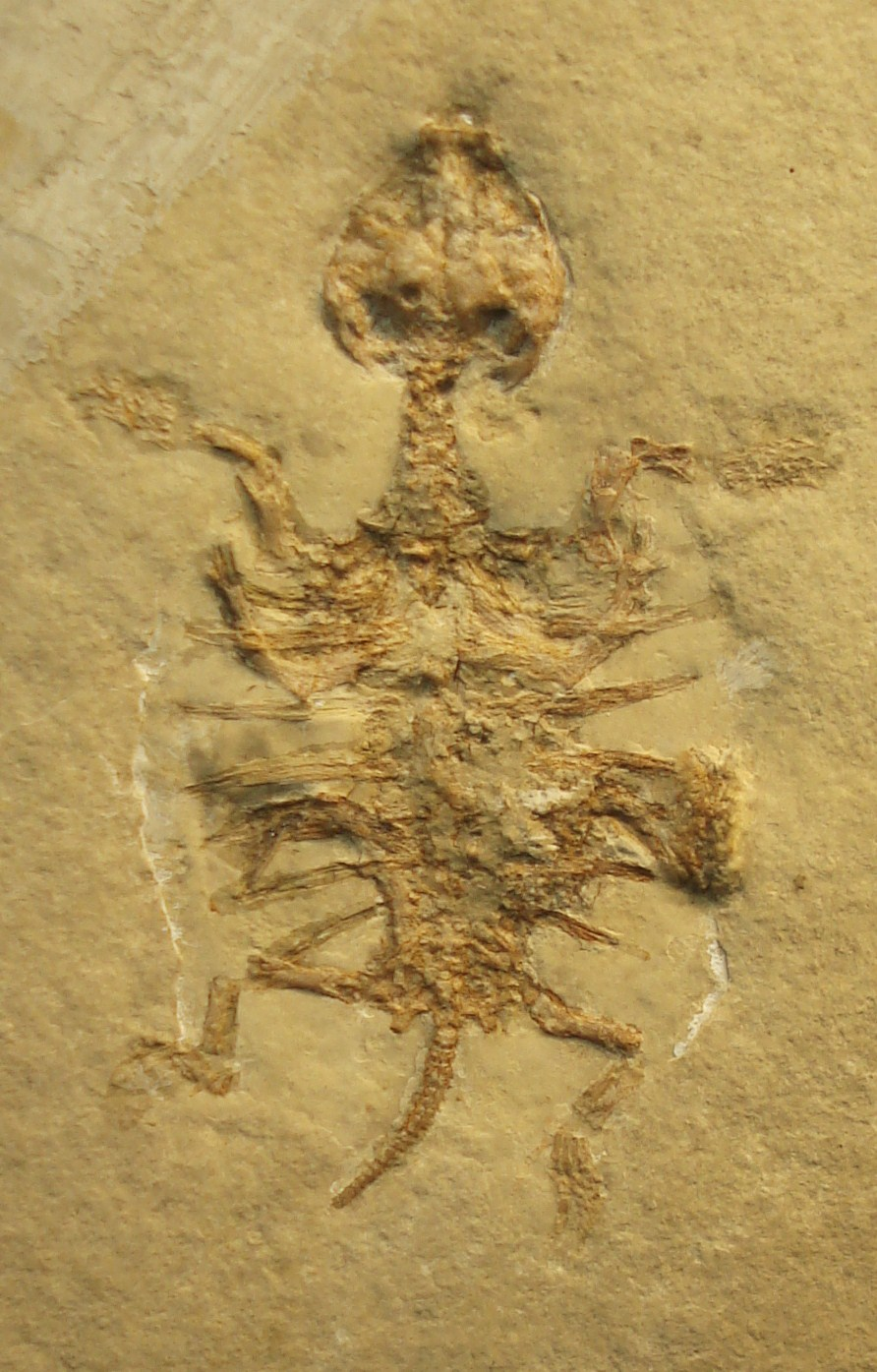
- Aplax oberndorferi.

Scientific classification
- Domain: Eukaryota
- Kingdom: Animalia
- Phylum: Chordata
- Class: Reptilia
- Clade: Pantestudines
- Clade: Testudinata
- Clade: †Thalassochelydia
- Genus: †Aplax; Meyer, 1843
- Species: †A. oberndorferi

Binomial name
- †Aplax oberndorferi Meyer, 1843

= Aplax =

Aplax Temporal range: Tithonian

Extinct genus of turtles

Aplax is a dubious genus of extinct thalassochelydian turtle from the Late Jurassic of Germany. The type and only species is Aplax oberndorferi, named by Hermann von Meyer in 1843 for a complete juvenile skeleton from the early Tithonian of the Solnhofen Formation in Bavaria. Despite being aware that shell morphology changes during growth, Meyer named Aplax due to his consideration it represented a relative of Dermochelys, where the adults lack distinction of shell regions as in Aplax. However the taxon was later referred to Thalassochelydia by Anquetin and colleagues in 2017, and due to the loss of the original holotype it cannot be identified as a distinct taxon of a juvenile of existing Solnhofen turtles and is therefore a nomen dubium.
