= Cretorectolobus =

Cretorectolobus Temporal range: Hauterivian-Maastrichtian ~129–66 Ma

Scientific classification
- Kingdom: Animalia
- Phylum: Chordata
- Class: Chondrichthyes
- Subclass: Elasmobranchii
- Division: Selachii
- Order: Orectolobiformes
- Family: Orectolobidae
- Genus: †Cretorectolobus; Case, 1978

Extinct genus of sharks

Cretorectolobus is an extinct carpet shark. It was described by G.R. Case in 1978, and the type species is C. olsoni, which existed during the Campanian in Canada and the United States. Another species, C. gracilis, was described by Charlie J. Underwood and Mitchell in 1999, from the Hauterivian to Barremian strata of the Speeton Clay Formation of England. The species epithet refers to the shark's teeth, which Underwood and Mitchell described as gracile and narrow in form. A new species, C. robustus, was described from the Cenomanian of Canada by Underwood and Stephen L. Cumbaa in 2010.

== Species ==
- †Cretorectolobus olsoni Case, 1978
- †Cretorectolobus gracilis Underwood & Mitchell, 1999
- †Cretorectolobus robustus Underwood & Cumbaa, 2010

== Fossil distribution ==
Fossils of Cretorectolobus have been found in:

Hauterivian-Barremian

- Speeton Clay Formation, England

Albian

- Cedar Mountain Formation, Utah
- Kolbay, Kazakhstan

Cenomanian

- Saskatchewan, Canada

Campanian

- Aguja Formation, Mexico
- Dinosaur Park Formation, Alberta
- Judith River Formation, Saskatchewan, Canada and Montana, United States
- Mesaverde Group, Wyoming
- Åsen and Ignaberga, Sweden

Maastrichtian

- Kemp Clay Formation, Texas
- Bakla Hill, Ukraine
