= Parachelys =

Parachelys Temporal range: Kimmeridgian-Tithonian

Scientific classification
- Domain: Eukaryota
- Kingdom: Animalia
- Phylum: Chordata
- Class: Reptilia
- Clade: Pantestudines
- Clade: Testudinata
- Clade: †Thalassochelydia
- Family: †Eurysternidae
- Genus: †Parachelys von Meyer, 1864

Type species
- Parachelys eichstaettensis von Meyer, 1864

Extinct genus of turtles

Parachelys is a genus of Late Jurassic turtle from marine deposits in Bavaria, southern Germany.

The type species, P. eichstaettensis, is known only from the holotype NHMUK PV OR 42888. It can be distinguished from other members of Eurysternidae by the characteristics of its fontanelles, anterolateral contact of vertebral I with marginal I only, and the manual phalangeal formula 2-2-3-3-3.
