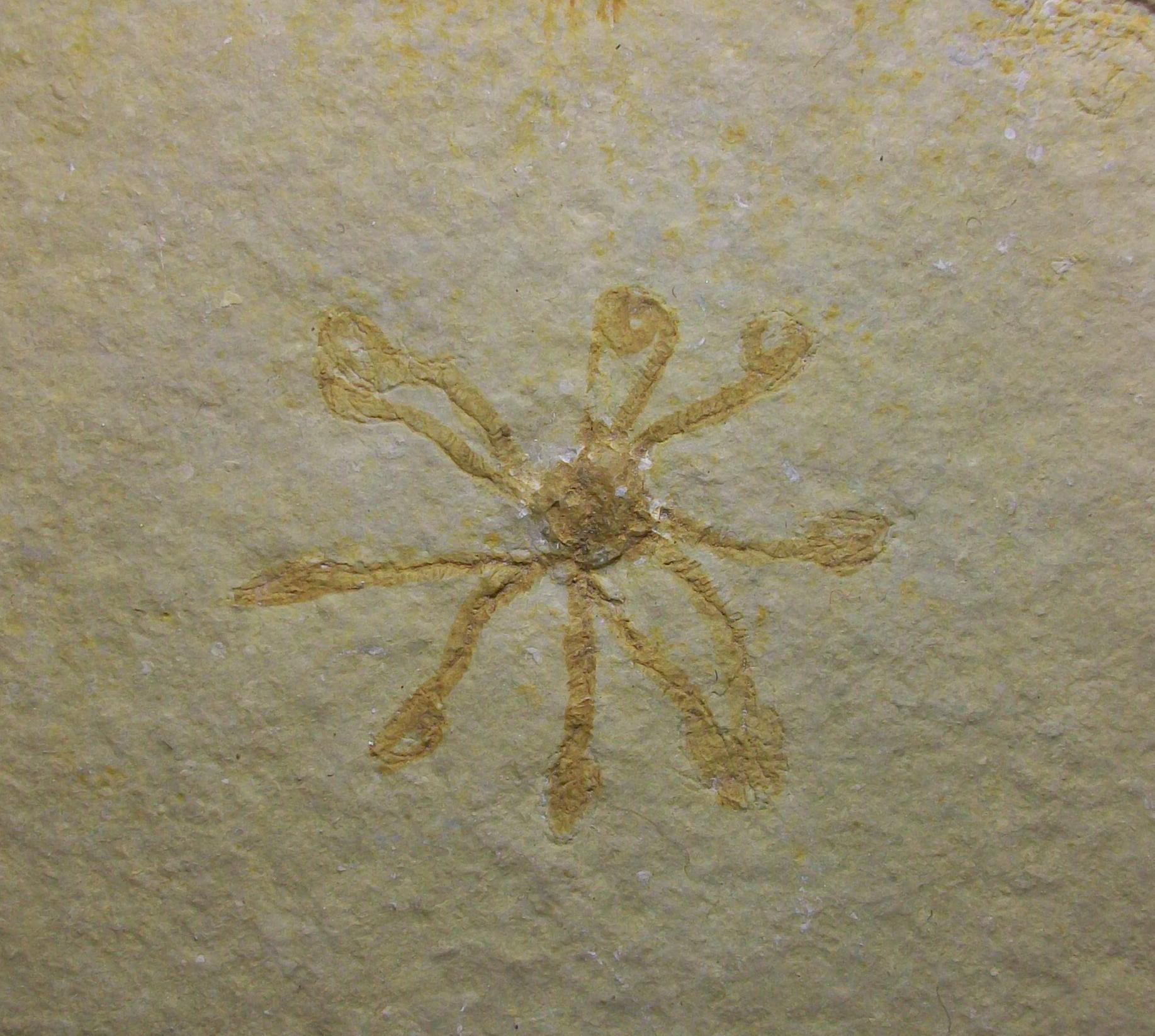
- Saccocoma alpina

Scientific classification
- Kingdom: Animalia
- Phylum: Echinodermata
- Class: Crinoidea
- Order: †Roveacrinida
- Family: †Saccocomidae
- Genus: †Saccocoma; Agassiz, 1836

Species
- † Saccocoma alpina † Saccocoma pectinata

= Saccocoma =

Saccocoma Temporal range: Late Jurassic–Early Cretaceous

Extinct genus of crinoids

Saccocoma is an extinct genus of crinoids that lived from the Late Jurassic to the Early Cretaceous in Europe and North America. It contains at least two species.

== Sources ==
- Fossils (Smithsonian Handbooks) by David Ward (Page 170)
