= Jurassichelon =

Jurassichelon Temporal range: Tithonian

Scientific classification
- Domain: Eukaryota
- Kingdom: Animalia
- Phylum: Chordata
- Class: Reptilia
- Clade: Pantestudines
- Clade: Testudinata
- Clade: †Thalassochelydia
- Genus: †Jurassichelon; Pérez García, 2015

Type species
- Jurassichelon oleronensis

Extinct genus of turtles

Jurassichelon is an extinct genus of basal eucryptodiran turtle that inhabited France during the early Tithonian stage of the Late Jurassic epoch. It is known from a single species, J. oleronensis.
