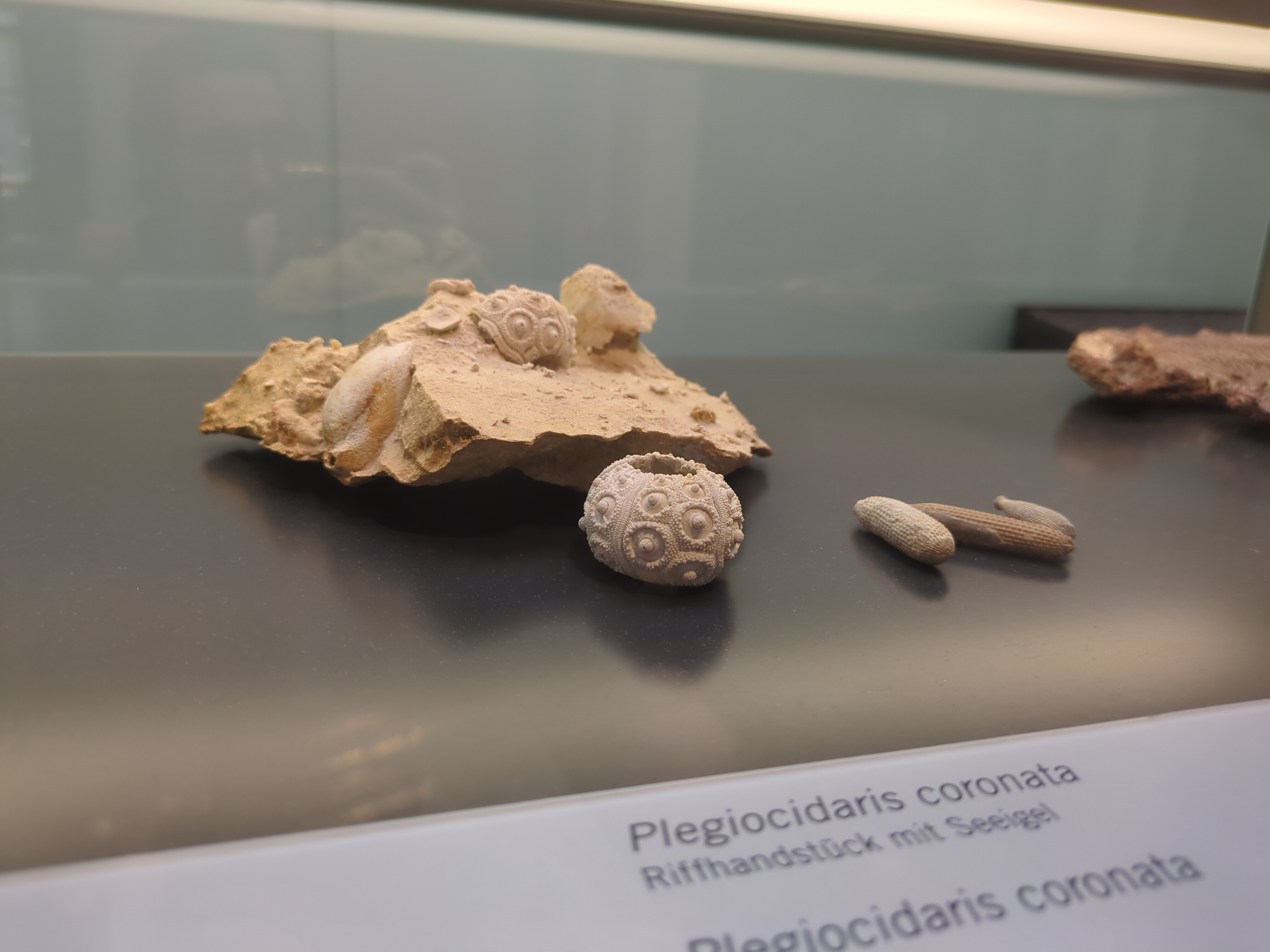

Scientific classification
- Kingdom: Animalia
- Phylum: Echinodermata
- Class: Echinoidea
- Order: Cidaroida
- Genus: †Plegiocidaris; Pomel 1883

= Plegiocidaris =

Plegiocidaris Temporal range: Triassic-Early Cretaceous

Extinct genus of sea urchins

Plegiocidaris is an extinct genus of echinoids that lived from the Triassic to the Early Cretaceous. Its remains have been found in Asia and Europe. It was named by the paleontologist Auguste Pomel.
