= Canjuers =

Plateau and military camp in Provence, France

Coordinates: 43°42′30″N 6°18′30″E

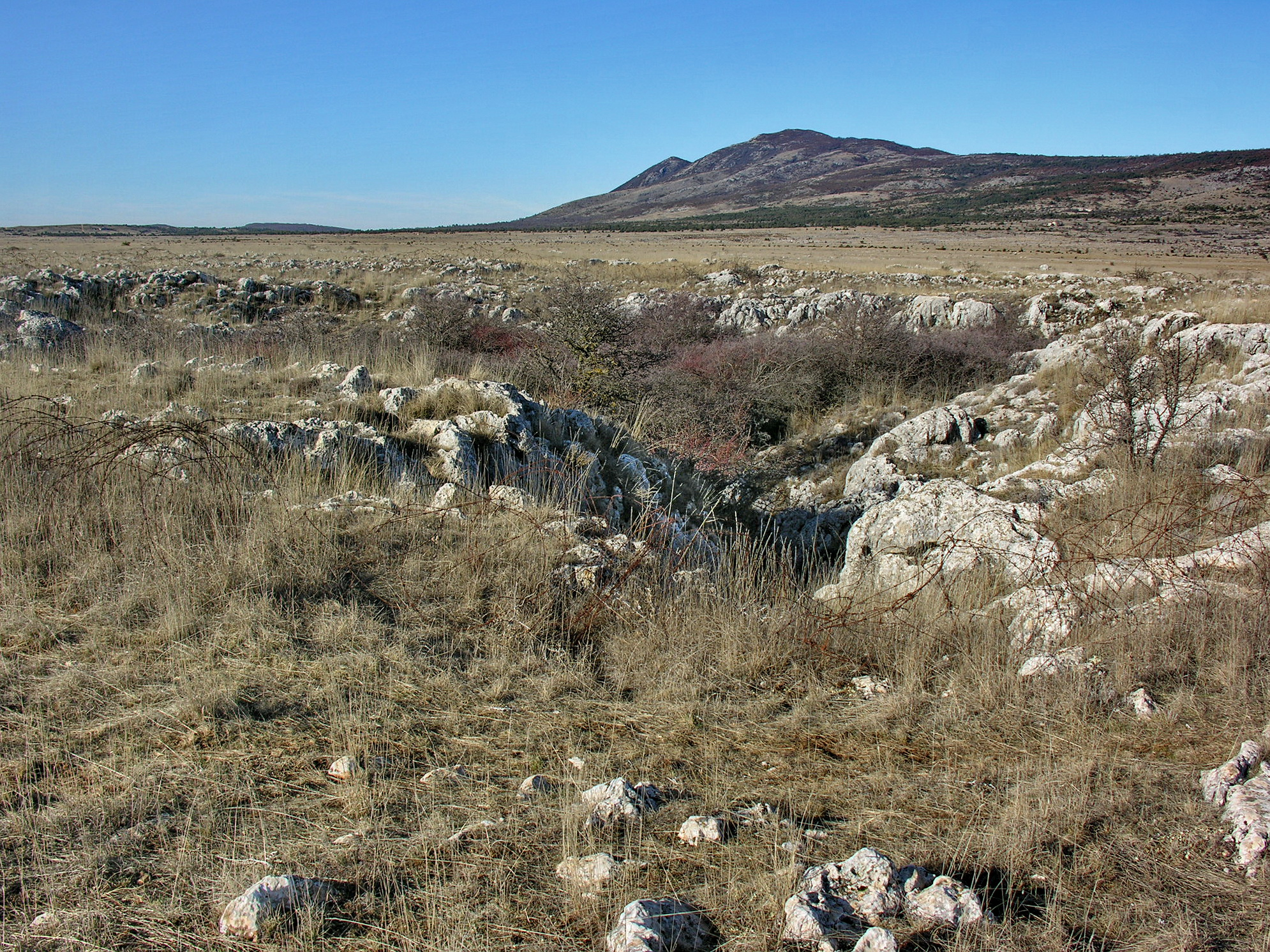
Grand Plan : Grande Nouguière cave

Canjuers is a calcareous plateau and a military camp in Provence located in southeastern France. It is the site of the largest military camp in Continental Europe.

== Geography ==
Situated in the département of the Var in the Prealps of Castellane, on the south of the Verdon Gorge and to the north of Draguignan.

With a median altitude of 800 m, the Plan of Canjuers is a desertic and arid plateau.

== History ==
Its name comes from Campus Julii: the "Julius Camp". Julius Caesar installed a campment in the area before the conquest of Gaul.

The region surrounding the plateau has been occupied by the Army since 1970. The Canjuers Camp is the largest military camp in Europe, covering 350 km^{2}. Many farms and hamlets have been evacuated and abandoned.
