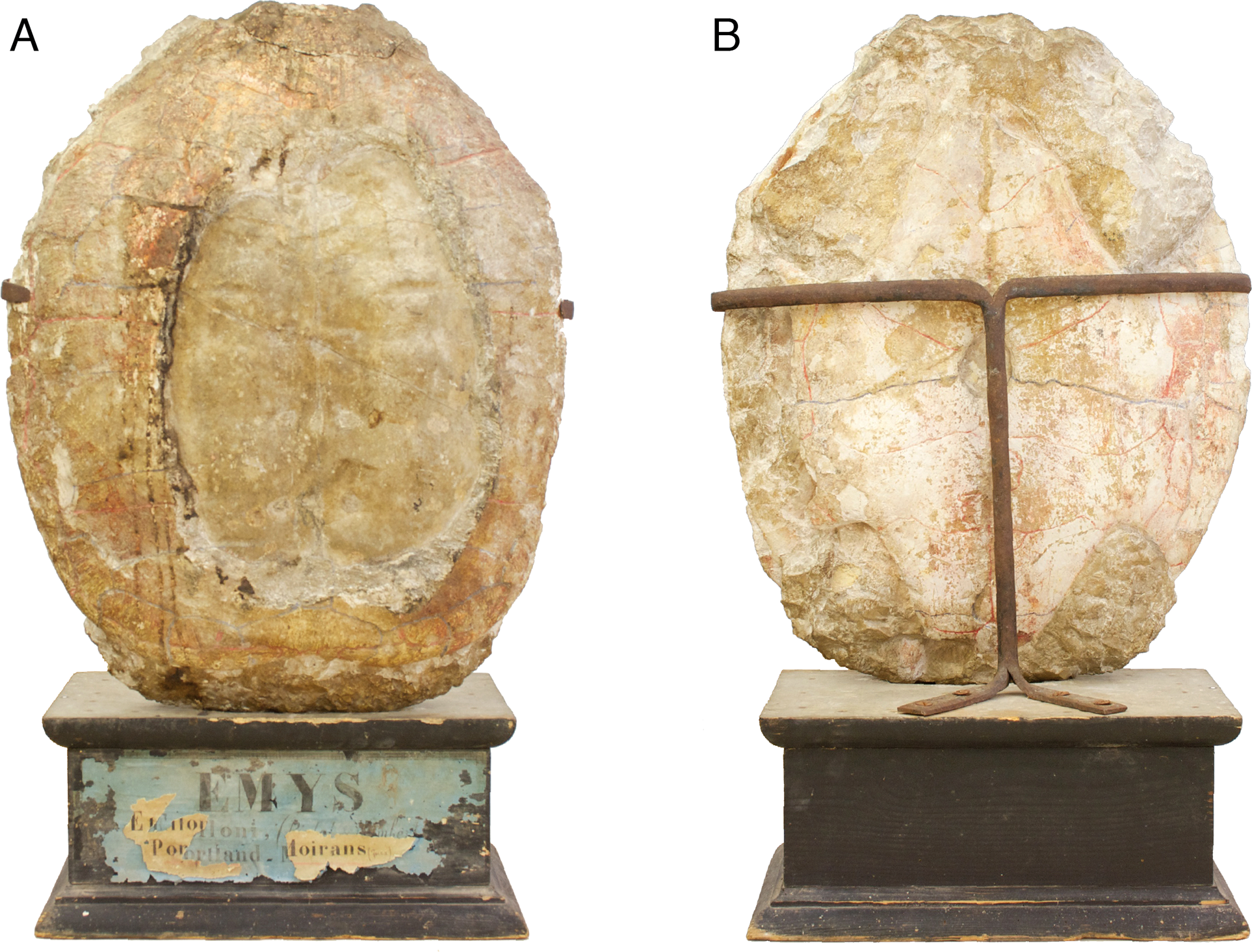
- Holotype shell of Plesiochelys. The shell is mounted upside-down

Scientific classification
- Kingdom: Animalia
- Phylum: Chordata
- Class: Reptilia
- Clade: Pantestudines
- Clade: Testudinata
- Clade: †Thalassochelydia
- Family: †Plesiochelyidae
- Genus: †Plesiochelys; Rütimeyer, 1873

Type species
- †Plesiochelys etalloni (Pictet & Humbert, 1857)

Other species
- †Plesiochelys bigleri Püntener, Anquetin & Billon-Bruyat, 2017

Synonyms
- Synonyms of P. etalloni: Emys etalloni Pictet & Humbert, 1857; Plesiochelys solodurensis Rütimeyer, 1873; Plesiochelys sanctaeverenae Rütimeyer, 1873; Plesiochelys langii Rütimeyer, 1873

= Plesiochelys =

Plesiochelys Temporal range: Jurassic, Kimmeridgian–Tithonian

Genus of turtle

Plesiochelys ("near turtle") is a genus of late Jurassic European and Asian turtle. The type species is Plesiochelys etalloni.

Fossil records have discovered Plesiochelys bigleri and Plesiochelys etalloni from the Kimmeridge Clay of England and outside the Swiss and French Jura Mountains.

A recent study placed Plesiochelys as an Angolachelonia and outside Testudines.

== Sources ==
- Gaffney, Eugene S. "A taxonomic revision of the Jurassic turtles Portlandemys and Plesiochelys. American Museum Novitates; no. 2574." (1975).
