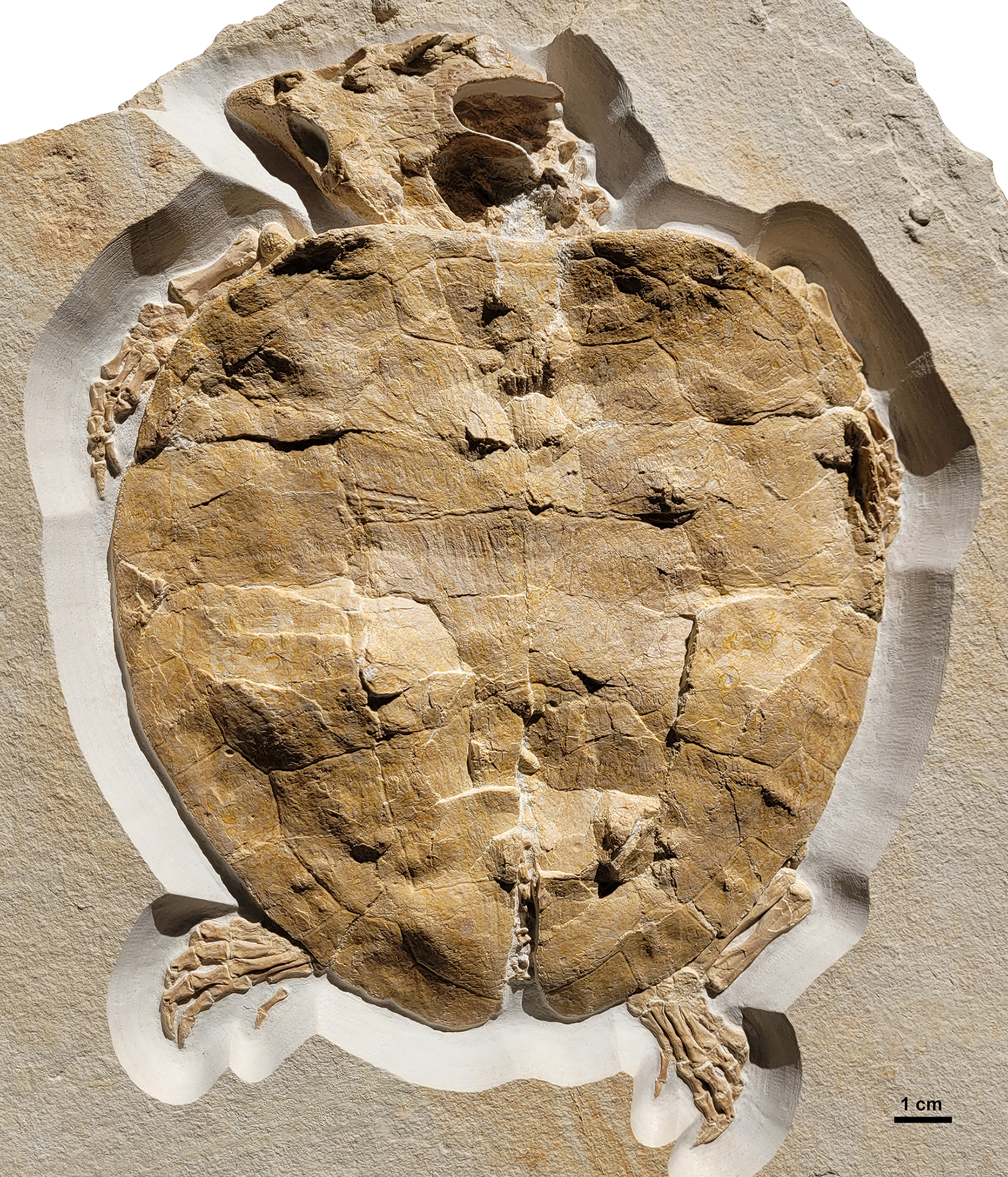

Scientific classification
- Kingdom: Animalia
- Phylum: Chordata
- Class: Reptilia
- Clade: Pantestudines
- Clade: Testudinata
- Clade: †Thalassochelydia
- Family: †Eurysternidae
- Genus: †Solnhofia; Gaffney, 1975

Species
- Solnhofia parsonsi Gaffney, 1975; Solnhofia brachyrhyncha Anquetin & Püntener, 2020

= Solnhofia =

Solnhofia Temporal range: Kimmeridgian–Tithonian

Extinct genus of turtles

Solnhofia is a genus of extinct thalassochelydian turtle from the Late Jurassic of Germany. The type species is Solnhofia parsonsi, named by Gaffney in 1975 for a partial skull and jaw from the early Tithonian of the Solnhofen Formation in Bavaria. Additional material including a complete skeleton is known from the late Kimmeridgian of Switzerland and the Kimmeridgian/Tithonian of other deposits within Bavaria, and potentially also unprepared material from the Late Jurassic of France. The genus was referred to the family Eurysternidae by Anquetin and colleagues in 2017, which may represent an artificial grade of early thalassochelydians. In 2020 a new species Solnhofia brachyrhyncha was described from the Kimmeridigan aged Reuchenette Formation of Switzerland.
