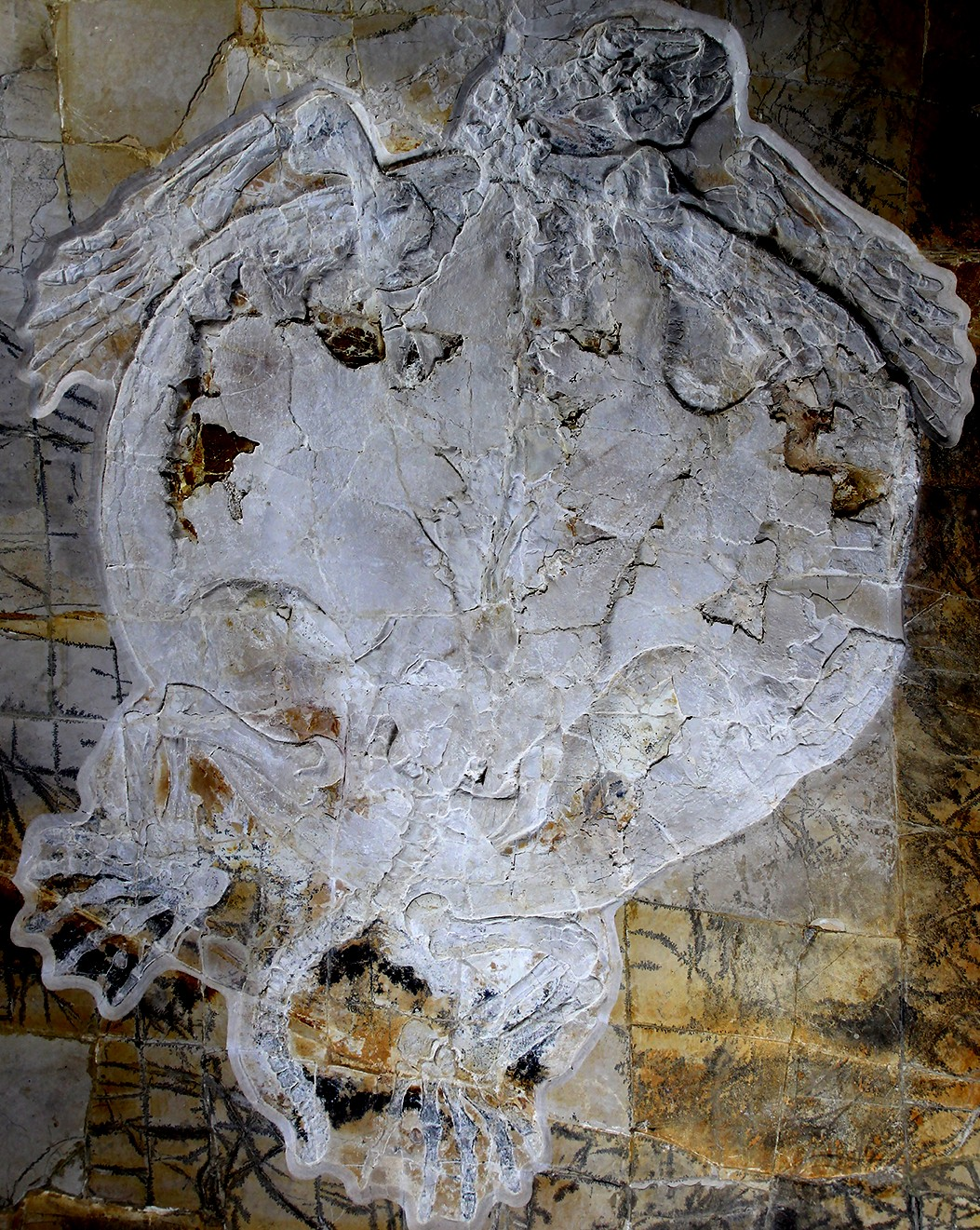
- Skeleton of Thalassemys bruntrutana

Scientific classification
- Kingdom: Animalia
- Phylum: Chordata
- Class: Reptilia
- Clade: Pantestudines
- Clade: Testudinata
- Clade: Mesochelydia
- Clade: Perichelydia
- Clade: †Thalassochelydia; Anquetin et al., 2017

Subgroups
- Aplax; Caesaria; Cyrtura; Enaliochelys; Euryaspis; Hispaniachelys; Jurassichelon; Neusticemys; Owadowia; Pelobatochelys; Eurysternidae; Plesiochelyidae; Thalassemydidae; Protostegidae?; Sandownidae?

= Thalassochelydia =

Thalassochelydia Temporal range: Late Jurassic, Oxfordian–Berriasian

Extinct clade of turtles

Thalassochelydia is a clade of extinct marine stem-turtles from the Late Jurassic and earliest Cretaceous of Europe and South America. The group is broadly defined as the largest extinct clade including Eurysternum, Plesiochelys, or Thalassemys. While a clade uniting the families Eurysternidae, Plesiochelyidae and Thalassemydidae had been supported by phylogenetic evidence, a name was not given for the clade until 2017, when Jérémy Anquetin and colleagues coined Thalassochelydia.

While inner relationships of the clade are so uncertain as to make the monophyly of the families questionable, the significant diversity of thalassochelydians makes using the potentially invalid terms useful to describe the different morphologies. The monophyly of Thalassochelydia was further supported by a later analysis by Serjocha Evers and Roger Benson in 2019, where the group, represented by Solnhofia and Plesiochelyidae was sister taxon to Sandownidae within the clade Angolachelonia, which, unlike as found by Anquetin et al. earlier, was outside Cryptodira and Testudines.

== Phylogenetics ==
The phylogeny below of Thalassochelydian inter-relationships follows the results of Anquetin and colleagues in 2017.

- Thalassochelydia
  - "Eurysternidae"
    - Achelonia
    - Chelonides
    - Eurysternum
    - Hydropelta
    - Idiochelys
    - Palaeomedusa
    - Parachelys
    - Solnhofia
  - "Plesiochelyidae"
    - Craspedochelys
    - Plesiochelys
    - Portlandemys
    - Tropidemys
  - Enaliochelys
  - Jurassichelon
  - Neusticemys
  - Owadowia
  - Pelobatochelys
  - "Thalassemydidae"
    Thalassemys

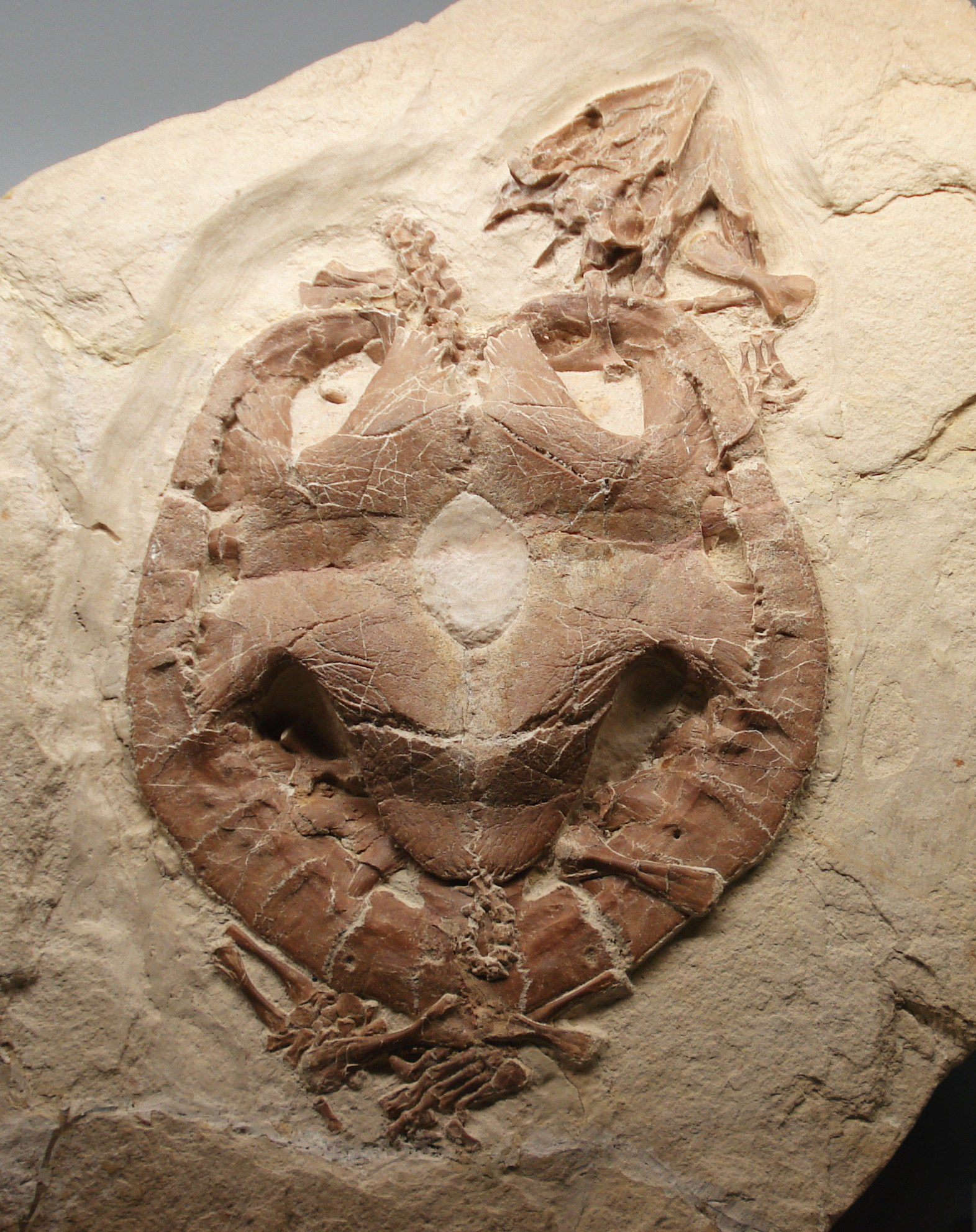
Solnhofia

All species, aside from Neusticemys from the Vaca Muerta of Patagonia, are known from Europe. An thalassochelydian skull from the Berriasian aged Purbeck Group of southern England represents the only reliable Cretaceous record of the group.

A 2018 study found Sandownidae to represent a sister group to Thalassochelydia, under the clade Angolachelonia. Similarly, a 2021 study found Protostegidae and Sandownidae to possibly be closely related to or even members of Thalassochelydia, although the exact affinities of the clade are still an open question. If Protostegidae is included, the clade might exist just outside Chelonoidea, which contains the extant sea turtles.

== Biology ==
At least some taxa developed flippers similar to those of chelonioidean sea turtles, an example of convergent evolution. The morphology of the limb girdles resembles those of modern sea turtles, suggesting that they swam in a similar manner.
