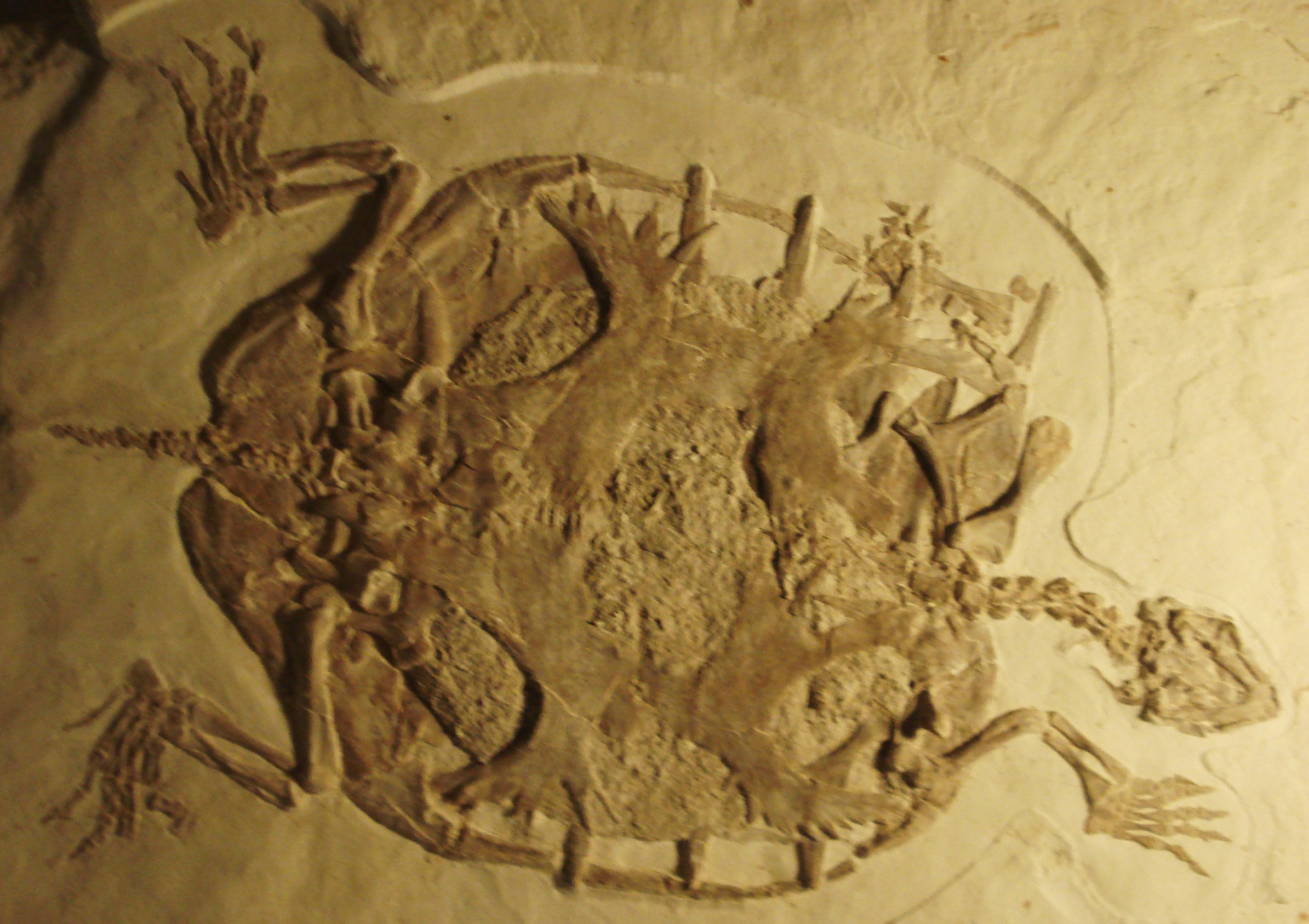
- Fossil in Bürgermeister Müller Museum

Scientific classification
- Domain: Eukaryota
- Kingdom: Animalia
- Phylum: Chordata
- Class: Reptilia
- Clade: Pantestudines
- Clade: Testudinata
- Clade: †Thalassochelydia
- Family: †Eurysternidae
- Genus: †Eurysternum; Meyer, 1839

Species
- E. wagleri Meyer, 1839

Synonyms
- Acichelys Meyer, 1854

= Eurysternum =

Eurysternum Temporal range: Kimmeridgian ~155–150 Ma

Extinct genus of turtles

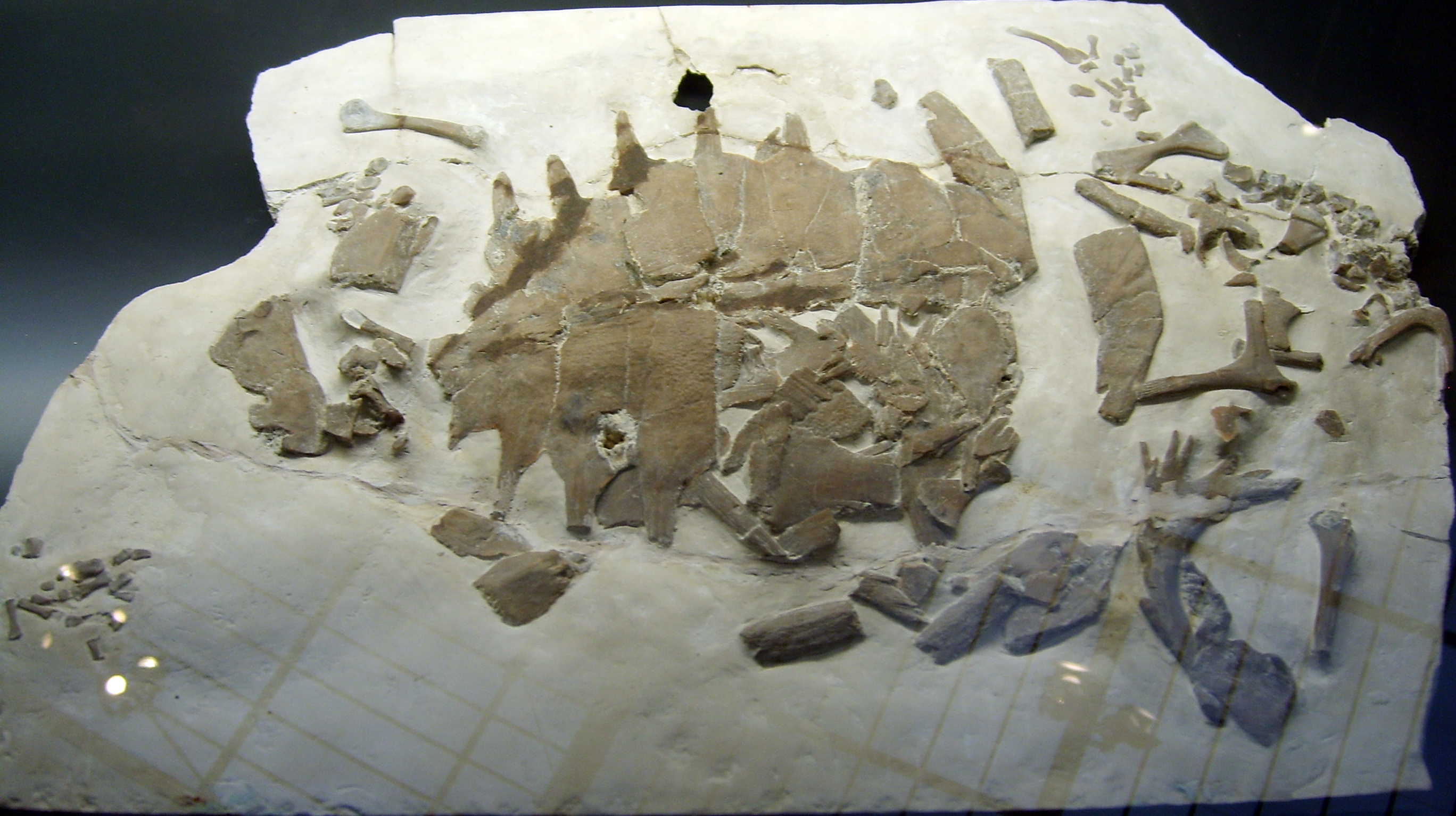
Fossil in Museum für Naturkunde, Berlin

Eurysternum is an extinct genus of thalassochelydian turtle. Its type species is Eurysternum wagleri, the holotype of which has since been lost and only survives in illustrations.

== Formerly assigned species ==
Eurysternum ignoratum Bram, 1965 is a junior synonym of Thalassemys hughii. The Late Jurassic species Eurysternum neuquinum Fernandez and de la Fuente, 1988, described from marine deposits in Argentina, is now placed in its own genus Neusticemys.
