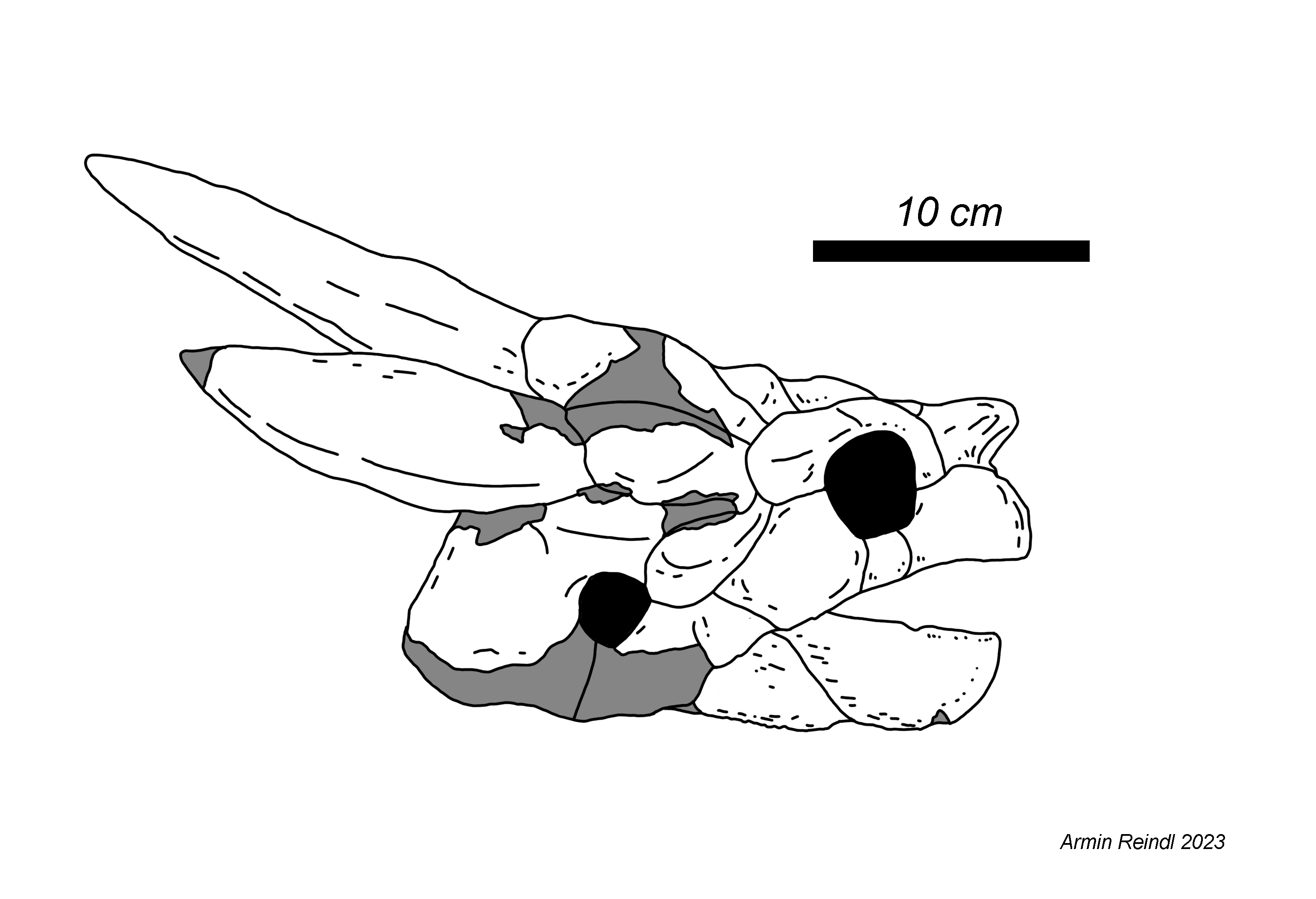
- Skull and mandible

Scientific classification
- Kingdom: Animalia
- Phylum: Chordata
- Class: Reptilia
- Clade: Pantestudines
- Clade: Testudinata
- Family: †Meiolaniidae
- Genus: †Niolamia; Ameghino, 1899

Species
- †N. argentina Ameghino, 1899

Synonyms
- Miolania argentina Woodward, 1901; Crossochelys corniger Simpson & Williams, 1938

= Niolamia =

Niolamia Temporal range: Eocene

Extinct genus of turtles

Niolamia is an extinct genus of South American meiolaniid turtle with a long and complex history. Like its relatives, Niolamia was a robust and heavily armored terrestrial turtle with large, horn like scales covering its head and a tail encased by rings of bone. This heavily armored build may have served the animal during intraspecific combat during courtship, though such encounters likely did not involve the horns and frill, which are thought to serve more of a display function. Scans of the skull reveal that Niolamia likely had a great sense of smell but only low frequency hearing, indicating that these animals communicated more through chemical signals and smells than through sound.

Niolamia is one of only two named meiolaniid turtles from South America, the other being Gaffneylania. Given that this family is primarily distributed throughout the Neogene and Quaternary of Australasia, this makes Niolamia an important piece in the evolutionary history and origin of this turtle family.

Remains attributed to Niolamia were seemingly first uncovered by Santiago Roth in 1889, with a well preserved skull found only shortly afterwards. The name Niolamia was however not coined by Roth or any of his contacts, but by Florentino Ameghino who briefly wrote about what was said to be another skull discovered by his brother. While Ameghino's name was retained for the animal, later publications were entirely based on Roth's material, as Ameghino neither diagnosed nor figured his fossil. The fact that Ameghino's material was never recovered after his initial communication has led some researchers to believe that the two specimens are one and the same.

== History and naming ==
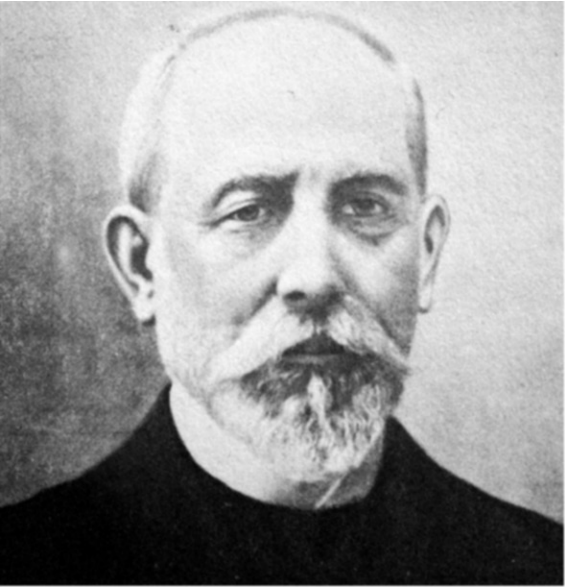
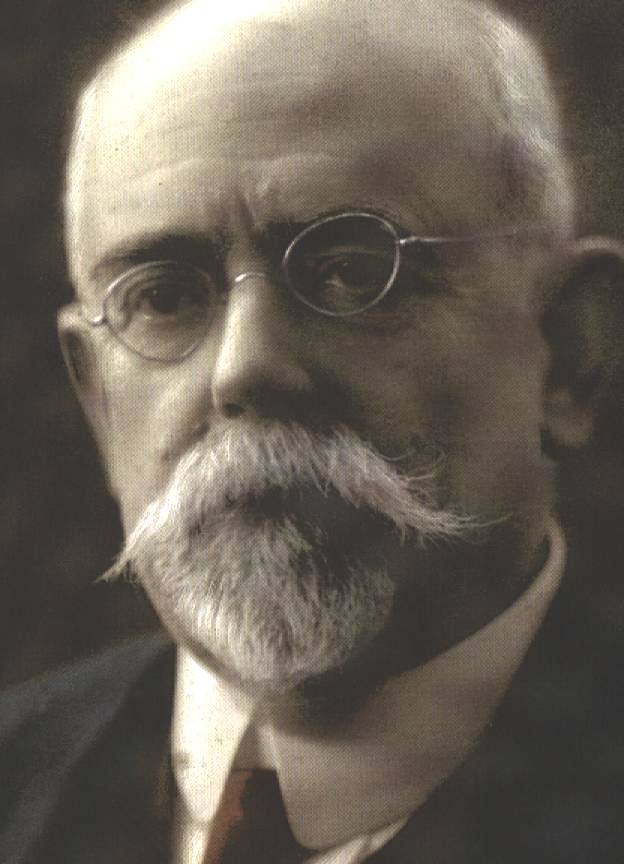
The research history of Niolamia was heavily influenced by the rivalry between Florentino Ameghino (left) and Francisco Moreno (right).

In 1898, British paleontologist Arthur Smith Woodward was sent a photograph of a meiolaniid tail ring by fossil collector Santiago Roth, who worked under Francisco Pascasio Moreno. Woodward writes that he was able to study the fossil itself in early 1899 after the material was sent from Argentina to London, allowing him to compare it to the remains of Meiolania platyceps, a turtle named by Richard Owen from Australia. According to Woodward, Moreno tasked Roth with a follow-up expedition, which recovered additional remains in the form of a carapace, skull and associated mandible.

That same year Argentinian paleontologist Florentino Ameghino coined the name Niolamia argentina for a skull he claimed his brother Carlos discovered in the Guaranitic Formation. However, little information was given by Ameghino at the time, as the researcher didn't established a holotype, didn't diagnose the species or even figured the fossil material. The imprecise information was not an accident, but the result of the rivalry between Ameghino and Moreno. Their rivalry, similar to the Bone Wars between Edward Drinker Cope and Othniel Charles Marsh in America, saw the two intentionally hide records from one another, eventually leading to the complete loss of some information.

Around the same time Moreno authored a short communication describing the material Roth reportedly uncovered on his second expedition. Although various postcranial remains were also described, the skull (specimen MLP 26–40) was the only element that was figured. Two years later Arthur Smith Woodward published a more detailed paper, in which he illustrated the material more extensively and assigned it to the same species mentioned previously by Ameghino. However, rather than using the name Niolamia, Woodward created the combination Miolania argentina based on an accidental misspelling of Meiolania. Despite declaring Niolamia a junior synonym, Ameghino seemingly concurred with Woodward, using the combination himself in later publications. However, Sterli raises the possibility that rather than accepting synonymity, Ameghino never meant to call his material Niolamia in the first place and also misspelled Meiolania in his prior work.

The naming issue was somewhat resolved when George Gaylord Simpson and Coleman S. Williams established Roth's material as the neotype of Niolamia in 1938, reasoning that Ameghino's material was not described thoroughly enough to serve as the holotype. In the same paper the researchers also officially described additional meiolaniid remains from the Eocene parts of the Sarmiento Formation (then named the Casamayor Formation), which they named Crossochelys corniger. Although Simpson argued that the material of Crossochelys was not that of a juvenile, Eugene S. Gaffney reasoned for the contrary in his 1996 review of meiolaniids, declaring Crossochelys a junior synonym of Niolamia.

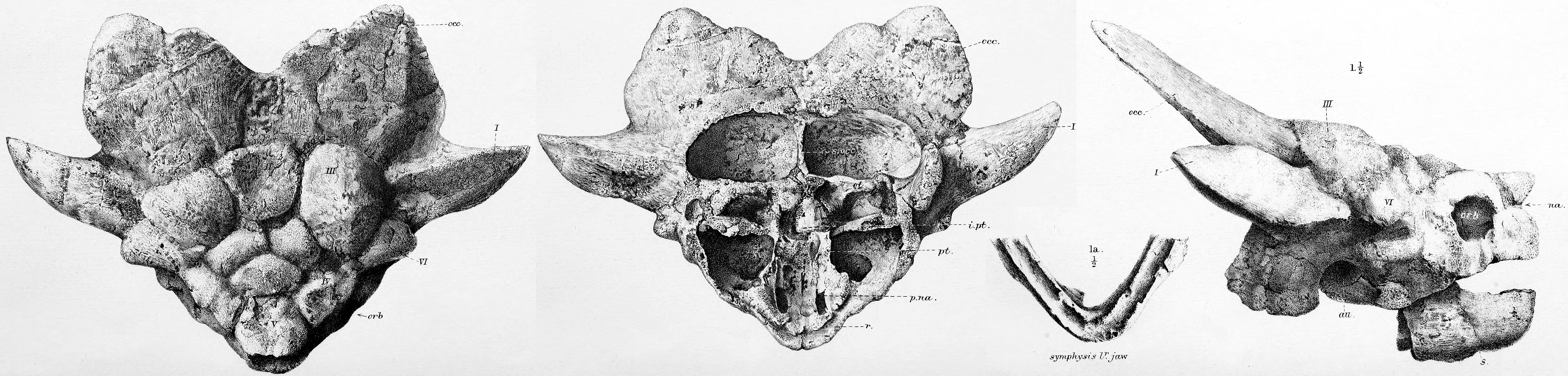
The Neotype skull as illustrated in Woodward (1901)

While meiolaniid research received a considerable boost under Gaffney, the fossils of Niolamia remained in storage and publications released during this time were primarily based on the work of Woodward, rather than first hand observation of the skull. The convoluted history and poor description of the early meiolaniid discoveries of South America eventually led to a full redescription of the neotype in 2011, authored by Juliana Sterli and Marcelo de la Fuente. Like Gaffney, they too argue that Crossochelys is simply a younger Niolamia individual, with the distinguishing features simply representing individual variation or traits that would change with age.

In a later publication, Sterli would further comment on the complex history of this taxon and the impact of the intense rivalry between Ameghino and Moreno on the history of Niolamia. According to Sterli, this competition may explain the whereabouts or rather the absence of Ameghino's fossil, which had seemingly disappeared from research history following the initial short description. No subsequent authors figured, described or even compared the Ameghino skull to the Roth skull. Juliana Sterli offers two possible explanations for this. It is possible that Ameghino's skull was simply lost, however it is likewise a possibility that the Ameghino and Roth skulls are the same specimen and that Ameghino misattributed the discovery to his brother. This would explain the improbability of two well preserved skulls being discovered in such quick succession by different teams and also explain why no researcher ever figured the Ameghino skull or compared it to the Roth material. Subsequently, Sterli refers to the neotype as the holotype in this publication.

=== Age and locality ===
The purposeful lack of information on the locality that the first Niolamia remains were found at and the general ambiguity around whether or not Ameghino's and Roth's skulls are distinct has led to a lot of confusion in subsequent years. Ameghino named the Guaranitic Formation in the Chubut Province as the place of origin of his fossils, claiming the material was collected near the Rio Sehuen and Rio Chubut. Woodward wrote that Roth's specimen meanwhile came from Cretaceous aged red sandstone, with the La Plata Museum specifying the Cañadón Blanco locality. However the mammal fauna of said locality is more in line with an Eocene to Oligocene age, which matches Ameghino's claim that Roth's material stems from Middle Eocene strata near Lake Musters and Lake Colhué Huapí. Analysis of the sediments present in the neotype's nasal cavity revealed it to be white tuff, very much unlike the sediments described by Woodward and similar to what is found in the Eocene to Miocene Sarmiento Formation. This is supported by the discovery of additional Niolamia fossils (initially described as Crossochelys) from the Sarmiento Formation. Subsequently, later research favors the hypothesis that these turtles lived during the Eocene.

== Description ==
=== Skull and horns ===
The best preserved fossil of Niolamia is a nearly completely preserved skull, which is the most diagnostic element in meiolaniid turtles. Like in its relatives, the skull is highly ankylosed, meaning the majority of sutures between the individual skull bones are fused and thus largely obscured. Only a few sutures are visible on the surface of the skull, primarily along the midline, however in ventral view (from the bottom) the connections between the bones are more clearly visible. Niolamia possesses a single opening for the nares, lacking any divisions in its internal structure. This sets the genus apart from later taxa like Ninjemys and Meiolania, in which the internal nares are partially or fully divided by a bony septum. Above the nares, the nasal bone forms a small projection that extends beyond the end of the premaxillae, however this is nowhere near as well developed as in Ninjemys. The endocranium of Niolamia is dominated by the nasal cavity, which makes up approximately 60% of its volume. The vestibulum nasi is elongated, which today is only seen in turtles with snorkel like noses such as the mata mata, pig-nosed turtle and softshell turtles.

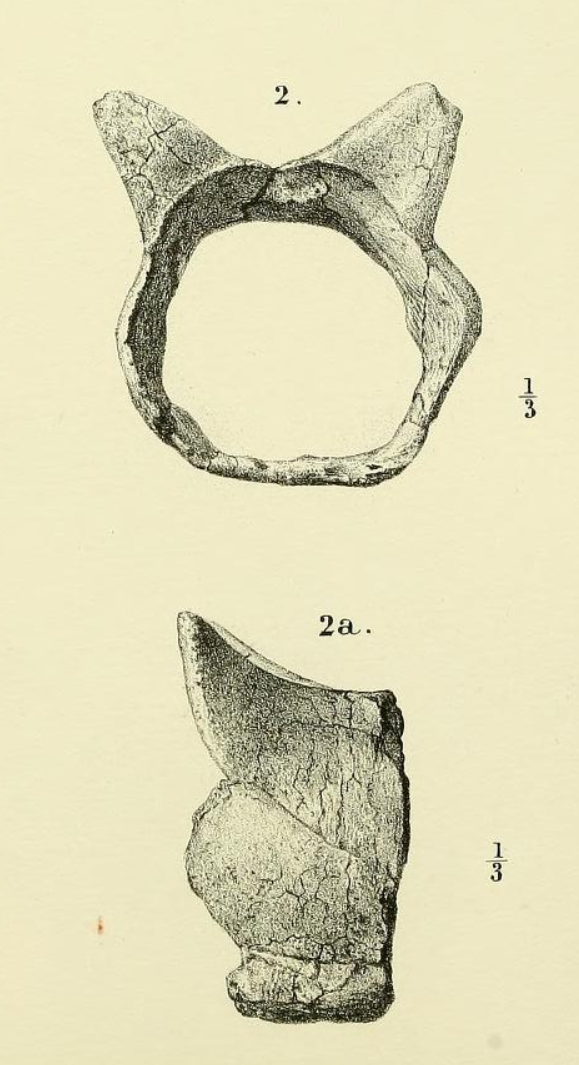
Tail ring of Niolamia argentina

Like other meiolaniids, the skull of Niolamia was covered in a multitude of horn or boss-like scales readily identifiable in the fossil material. These scales were described with varying nomenclature by different authors, with Woodward assigning them the numerals I - VII, while Simpson assigned letters to the individual scales. From Simpson's work, Gaffney refined and altered the nomenclature, which has since then become the standard nomenclature for the scale areas and horns of meiolaniid turtles. Most scales on the skull of Niolamia appear in pairs, the exception being scale A, X, Y and Z. Scale A in particular is part of the series of scales that form large horns and bosses along the back of the skull in all meiolaniids. While the region furthest back on the skull is covered by the A scale, which forms an "occipital crest". This crest appears as a large, upward directed frill with a deep notch along its middle. The B scales, which cover the horn cores formed by the squamosal bones, appear as large triangular elements directed to the side of the animal. These horns, which are similar to those of the Australian Ninjemys, are thought to have been even larger in life. The C scales sit before the B scales and are the smallest of the three elements, as is typical for turtles of this family. They extend outward and down, covering part of the skullroof and the side of the skull while overhanging the tympanic cavity. A striking feature that sets this turtle apart from its relatives is the size of the X scale. The X scale is a singular scale that is situated along the midline of the skull atop the skullroof. Typically, this is a rather small scale surrounded on all sides by the much larger D and G scales. In Niolamia however, this scale is among the largest, appearing as a rectangular element that takes up the entire skullroof between the D scales and thus preventing them from touching each other. It further stands out due to being concave, rather than bulging out like the D and G scales. However it is not clear if this actually represents how it appeared in life or if this was simply the result of distortion after the animals death. The E scales are small elements restricted to the side of the skull, just before the tympanic cavity. They are convex and form small, backward directed bosses. The H scales seen in derived meiolaniids appear to be missing in Niolamia. The F scales cover the region above the eye sockets, and the K and J scales the side of the skull from its back up to the beak region. The beak itself is covered by scale I, which can be divided into scale I1 and scale I2 in Niolamia. This region was likely covered by an extension of the rhamphotheca that covers the cutting surface turtles have in place of teeth. While the lower half of the snout tip is made up by the I scales, the top is covered by the unpaired scales Y and Z, extending from above the eyes to the elongated nasal bones.

=== Postcrania ===
In addition to the skull, Niolamia is also known from a variety of postcranial remains. Elements of both shoulder girdles are described, as both the left and right preserve the elongated dorsal process of the scapula, which extends upwards in turtles. This process connects to the acromion at an obtuse angle (greater than 90°), which resembles what is also seen in Meiolania platyceps and modern tortoises of the family Testudinidae. Overall, the anatomy of the shoulder blade has been taken to indicate a terrestrial lifestyle due to its similarity with modern tortoises.

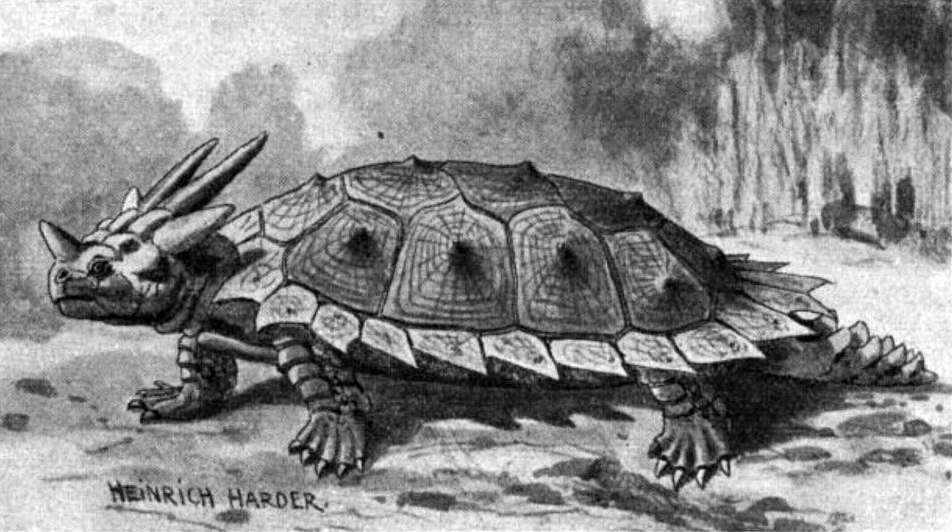
1914 reconstruction of Meiolania by Heinrich Harder, using fossils now assigned to Niolamia

While no complete shell of Niolamia is known, researchers were nonetheless able to determine several aspects of its shape. Although the largest fossils of the shell are flattened, this is believed to have been caused by taphonomy, crushing the bone during preservation. Instead, it is suggested that Niolamia had a domed shell like modern tortoises, a hypothesis in part based on the angle between the dorsal process and the acromion of the shoulder blade, which resembles modern testudinids. The shell appears to be thickest towards the borders and thinnest towards the midline of the shell, reaching a maximum thickness of 1.5 cm (0.59 in). Of the ten recovered shell remains, only four have their position on the shell known. The largest fragment was likely located at the back edge of the carapace, correlating with the 8th costal plate (which cover the shell between its spine and edge) and the 10th & 11th peripheral plates (the bony plates forming the edge of the bony shell). In this region the shell appears to possess backwards directed spikes. Rather than holding its shape towards the back of the shell, the carapace of Niolamia forms a ditch at its rear-most point, creating an embayment bordered by the final supracaudal scale. The recovered pattern of sutures and scale sulci is similar to that of modern tortoises, but could not be compared to the shell of Meiolania, in which the number of scales is unknown.

The carapace length of Niolamia has been estimated based on comparison between shell fragments and the general proportions of the related Meiolania as well as those of the stem-turtle Proganochelys. The result yielded an estimated shell length of 1.2 m (3 ft 11 in) for Niolamia, however this estimate is not a certain one due to the fact that only fragmentary shell remains were known. Subsequently, future discoveries could confirm or contradict these results.

Like in other meiolaniids, the tail of Niolamia was covered in a series of protective bony rings that overlapped one another. These rings were roughly hexagonal in shape, with two pairs of spiky protrusions emerging. The top pair was more robust and directed upwards, while the smaller, lower pair was directed upwards and sideways. Unlike in Meiolania, and more like in Ninjemys, the tail rings of Niolamia were fully formed and lacked the opened underside seen in the more derived Meiolania.

== Phylogeny ==
Phylogenetic analysis consistently recover Niolamia in the same position relative to other meiolaniid turtles, which is as the basalmost member and sister to all Australasian taxa. This placement is consistent with both its appearance in time and its place of origins, as this genus is older than all named species from Australia and the western pacific islands. The bridge between Niolamia and the physically much different Meiolania is somewhat bridged by Ninjemys, typically recovered as the basalmost of the Australasian forms, as it shares multiple traits including the laterally directed horns and large A scale area with Niolamia. The later description of Gaffneylania, also from the Neogene of Argentina, did not change this placement much. However, this is in part due to the fragmentary nature of the later, as its position within the family is uncertain, being placed either alongside the derived Australasian forms or in a basal polytomy with Niolamia. The two phylogenetic trees below, after Gaffney, Archer & White and Sterli, de la Fuenta & Krause respectively, show the internal relationship of meiolaniids following the description of the two most recently named genera.

- - Niolamia argentina
  - - Ninjemys oweni
    - - Warkalania carinaminor
      - - Meiolania brevicollis
        - Meiolania platyceps
        - Meiolania sp.
        - Meiolania mackayi

- - Crown Testudines
  - Meiolaniformes
    - Chubutemys copelloi
    - - - Mongolochelys efremovi
        - Peligrochelys walshae
      - - - Otwayemys cunicularius
          - Kallokibotion bajazidi
        - Meiolaniidae
          - Niolamia argentina
          - Gaffneylania auricularis?
          - - Ninjemys oweni
            - Gaffneylania auricularis?
            - - Warkalania carinaminor
              - Gaffneylania auricularis?
              - Meiolania platyceps

== Paleobiogeography ==
Niolamia provides important insight into the paleobiogeography of meiolaniid turtles due to its presence in Neogene South America. In contrast to Niolamia, most other members of the family were endemic to Neogene to Quaternary Australasia, including Warkalania, Ninjemys, Meiolania and a variety of unnamed forms. For over 100 years Niolamia was the only form found outside this region until the discovery of Gaffneylania.

The presence of these two genera marks them as part of the Austral biogeogeographical kingdom, which includes southern South America, Antarctica, south Africa, Australia, Tasmania, New Zealand and New Guinea. Animals of this biogeographical kingdom were heavily affected by the breakup of Gondwana in their distribution, with Antarctica in particular serving as a connective bridge between the fauna of South America and Australasia. Meiolaniids derive from the primarily Gondwanan Meiolaniformes, which at one point would have been found in both southern South America and Antarctica. Given the fact that South Tasmanian Sea formed between the Cretaceous and late Eocene, meiolaniids must have arrived in Australia by this time, as is confirmed by the fossil record. Antarctica and South America would remain connected until the opening of the Drake Passage during the Eocene-Oligocene, by which point the South American meiolaniids had not only dispersed into Patagonia but already gone extinct. The cause of the extinction of Niolamia and other South American meiolaniids was likely the gradually cooling and drying climate of middle Eocene Patagonia.

== Paleobiology ==
=== Lifestyle and senses ===
Few studies directly deal with the specifics of Niolamia's lifestyle. One exception to this is a 2017 study dealing with the neuroanatomy of meiolaniids, which described the endocranial anatomy of Niolamia, Gaffneylania and Meiolania. Among the findings of the paper was that meiolaniids had an elongated vestibulum nasi. Although such a feature is associated with aquatic turtles today, correlating with a snorkel-like nose, it can also be interpreted as an adaptation for life in deserts based on extant lizards. In these lizards the elongated vestibulum helps the animal to keep its nose free of sand, which may also occur during digging. However, the authors do not settle on a specific hypothesis and instead offer a variety of alternative ideas. These include an enhanced sense of smell, thermoregulation or even the production of sound. An enhanced sense of smell is also supported by the size of the nasal cavity (cavum nasi proprium). It is even greater than in extant terrestrial turtles, which in turn have a greater nasal cavity than aquatic species. Although the possibility that the dorsal region of the nasal cavity could have aided in vocalisation or thermoregulation, based on comparison to ornithischian dinosaurs, is not dismissed outright, it is considered relatively unlikely given the much more simple structure in meiolaniids.

Leaving aside the potential for additional uses, the enhanced sense of smell inferred by the large nasal cavity could have served several functions from foraging to intraspecific communication. Particular focus is placed on the later, with modern turtles displaying a wide variety of glands used to produce chemical secretions (musk glands, cloacal secretions and mental glands). While the presence of these glands cannot be observed in meiolaniid fossils, they may have been tied to the keen sense of smell inferred for them. Furthermore, chemical cues are associated with combat and aggression between modern turtles, especially during courtship, which may entail various shell-based maneuvers. This is congruent with prior studies suggesting a combat function for the highly armored bodies of meiolaniid turtles, which feature differently shaped osteoderms and armored tails.

The inner ear of Niolamia meanwhile is rather conservative and more in-line with what is seen in terrestrial turtles, which have a wide angle between the anterior and posterior semicircular canals. In modern tortoises this angle is approximately 100°, in more aquatic turtles like geoemydids and plesiochelydids 80-95° and in meiolaniids up to 115°. In terrestrial species, this wide angle between the semicircular canals servers to improve the stability of the head while walking. Given the similarities to modern turtles however, it is assumed that they were sensitive to low frequency sounds and not especially vocal animals, relying more heavily on smell. However as significant changes in the inner ear anatomy may often be subtle, a larger sample size would be needed to make more concrete observations for Niolamia and other meiolaniids.

Generally, both the enhanced sense of smell and the anatomy of the inner ear support the idea that Niolamia was a terrestrial animal like modern tortoises. This is the most commonly inferred lifestyle for meiolaniid turtles and generally favoured over the aquatic model, which is occasionally suggested but not widely accepted.

=== Function of the horns ===
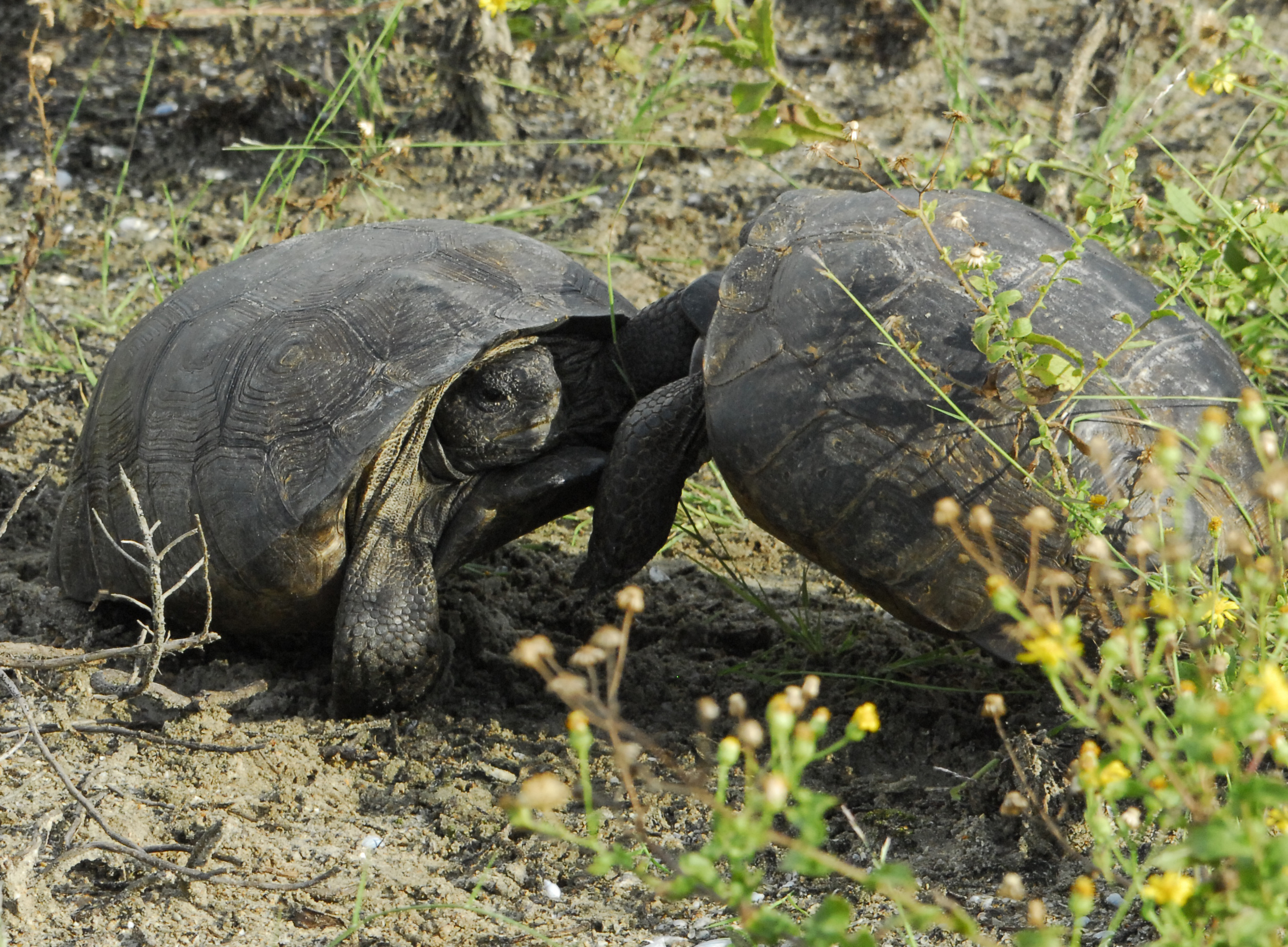
Male gopher tortoises engaging in combat

The potential use of the horns and frill has been a frequently considered but rarely studied matter, with the primary study on the matter being published in 2024. The publication analyzed a variety of hypothetical combat behaviors performed with the head, including headbutting, locking of the horns and frill and sideways stabbing and the stresses such actions put on the skeleton. Generally, impacts with the snout, forehead and struggling using the notch between the frill and horns cause the least amount of stress, as opposed to caudal torsion of the frill and sideways stabs. Given the large amounts of stress caused by the latter two actions, such behavior was generally deemed unlikely. This means that although the frill would be large enough to protect the neck, it's unlikely to have been used that way given the stresses of caudal torsion that would affect the bone in such a scenario.

Though impacts using the forehead are less stressful and Niolamia does share the presence of trabecular bone with the pachycephalosaurids, headbutting is still considered an unlikely behavior. Part of the reasoning behind this is that in pachycephalosaurids the shock of impacts is in part observed by their enlarged dome-like head structures, which as such are not present in Niolamia. The team further notes that the trabecular bone is more prominent in the horns and frills, yet these elements are positioned in a way that makes them unsuited for headbutting, with the frill in particular being angled so that would make direct contact with the frill of a rival impossible. Additional points against headbutting can be found in the absence of pathologies on the holotype of Niolamia and the fact that meiolaniids as a whole have highly ankylosed skulls, meaning the shock of an impact could not be absorbed by the sutures between bones. The team does however note that it is theoretically possible that such a function may have been instead filled by the scutes that covered the skull in life.

The team, led by Federico J. Degrange, concludes that though the animal's sense of smell was likely significant during courtship, it is more likely that the horns and frill served as a display structure rather than being used in intraspecific combat. Such a display ritual may have incorporated different ritualized movements of the head based on the range of motion observed from the more recent Meiolania. Nevertheless, this does not rule out other aggressive behavior that was speculated upon in prior studies, with Degrange and colleagues specifically highlighting the animal's ability to bite. Though a directly defensive function of the frill is also deemed unlikely, it may have still served as a visual deterrent when dealing with predators.

=== Ontogeny ===
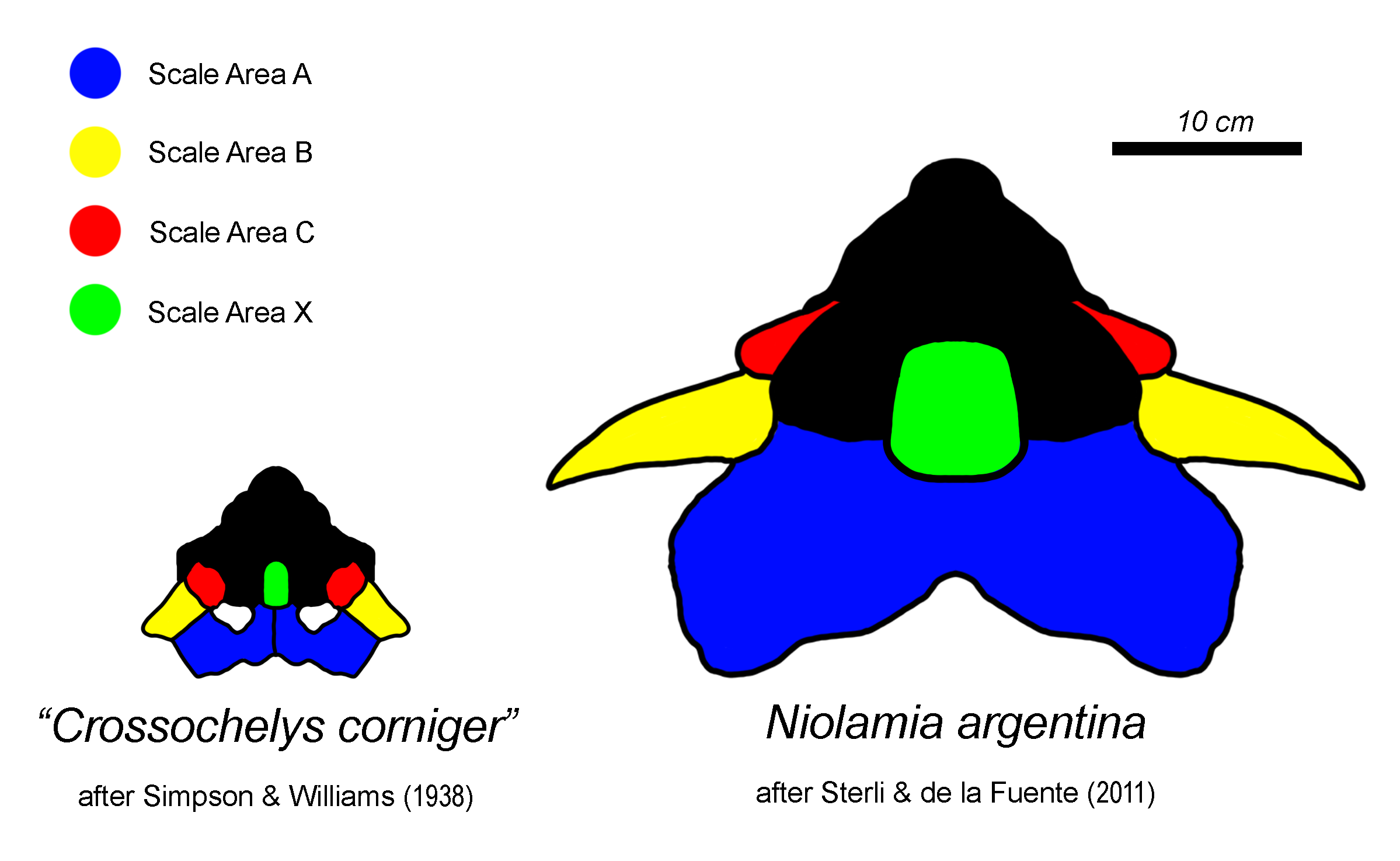
Ontogeny of Niolamia

Comparison between the neotype of Niolamia and AMNH 3161, formerly the holotype of Crossochelys and now considered to be a juvenile Niolamia, makes it possible to identify several changes the animal underwent in the process of reaching adulthood. AMNH 3161 represents a very young individual, less than a fourth the size of the Niolamia neotype skull. Accordingly, the shape of the horns is also significantly downplayed compared to those of adult individuals. The large scales at the back of the skull for instance, Scales A, were initially interpreted as being separate in Crossochelys. Following the synonymty, this interpretation is either wrong or the scales would combine into a single element in adults, as exemplified by the neotype. The X scale, which is the scale placed atop the midline of the skull, extends between the G scales in Crossochelys, while no such split occurs in Niolamia. The fact that the X scales in derived meiolaniids, such as Ninjemys and Warkalania, forms an extension like that of Crossochelys suggests that this could be a paedomorphic trait in later members of the family.

Among the features once considered to be diagnostic for Crossochelys was the presence of a "true temporal fenestra", however this is likely simply the result of the sutures not yet being closed in the juvenile.
