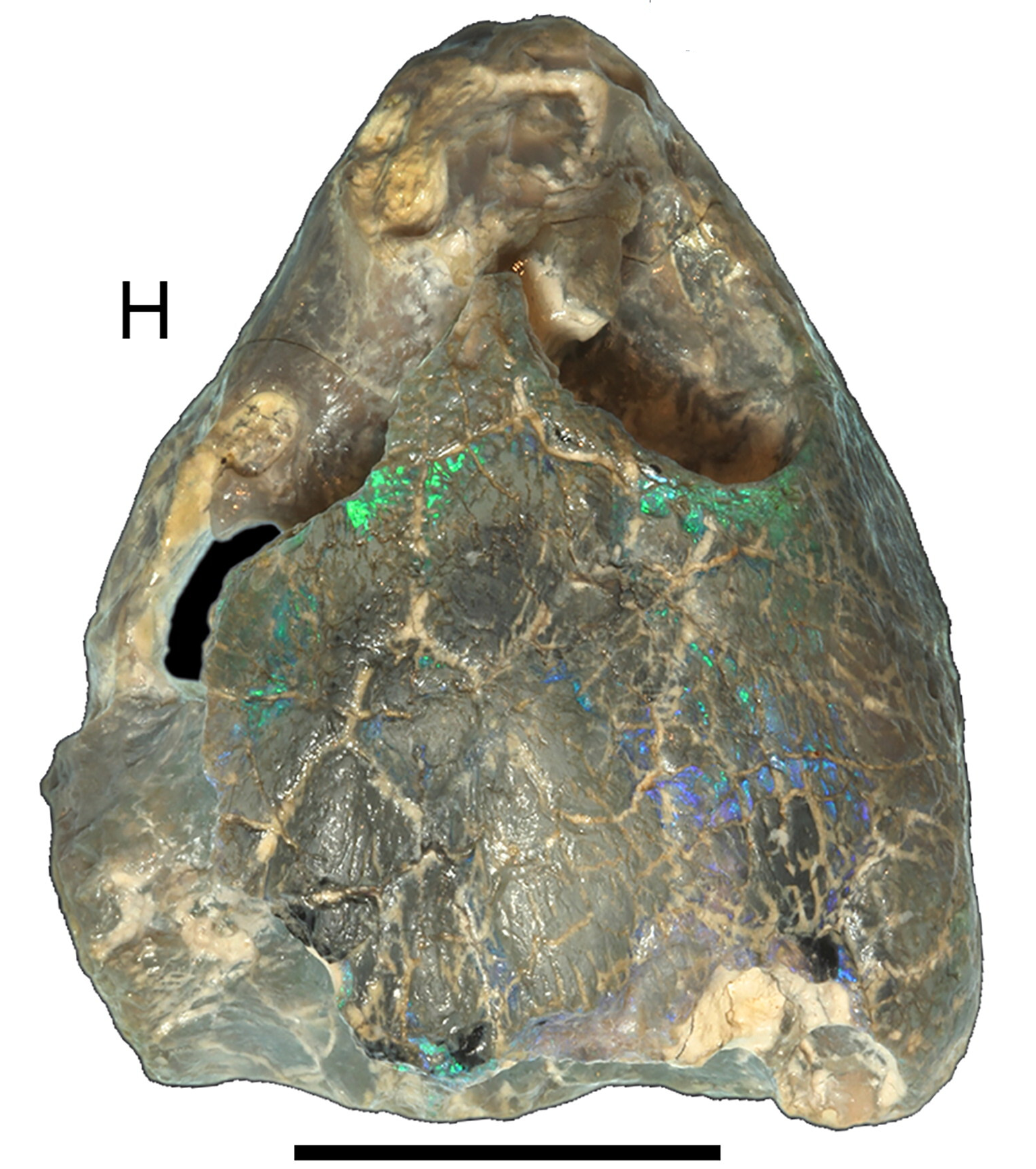
- Referred skull of Spoochelys (LRF-TH450). Scale = 2 cm.

Scientific classification
- Kingdom: Animalia
- Phylum: Chordata
- Class: Reptilia
- Clade: Pantestudines
- Clade: Testudinata
- Clade: Perichelydia
- Genus: †Spoochelys; Smith & Kear, 2013

Type species
- †Spoochelys ormondea Smith & Kear, 2013

= Spoochelys =

Spoochelys Temporal range: Late Cretaceous, ~99.6–93.5 Ma Cenomanian

Extinct genus of turtle

Spoochelys is an extinct genus of perichelydian turtle from the Late Cretaceous (Cenomanian) Griman Creek Formation of Australia. The genus contains a single species, Spoochelys ormondea.

== Discovery and naming ==
Fossil remains of Spoochelys were initially discovered by opal miners Rob and Debbie Brogan at the 'T-Bone Extension', a designated mining locality within the Coocoran Opal Fields, about 35 km west of Lightning Ridge, New South Wales, Australia. They were later donated and registered under the Australian Museum in Sydney.

The holotype specimens of Spoochelys consist of both cranial and postcranial elements including: parts of the skull (quadrate and supraoccipital) as well as parts of the upper shell (partial peripherals and costal fragments), caudal vertebrae, an ulna, scapula and pedal phalanges. Associated specimens comprise cervical, sacral and caudal vertebrae, a primary complete and secondary fragmentary pectoral girdle, humeri, ulnae, a femur and tibia as well as a tarsus and pes. Privately owned specimens associated with Spoochelys were described in 2013 alongside the aforementioned material, including a nearly complete skull, braincase and elements of the shell. Referred specimens originate from the 'T-Bone Extension' as well as the nearby 'Emu's Field' and 'Spook's Field' localities respectively.

In 2013, Smith and Kear, 2013 described Spoochelys ormondea as a new genus and species of turtle based on these fossil remains. The generic name, Spoochelys, references the locality 'Spook's Field' that yielded the most complete remains of the genus. The specific name, ormondea, is in honour of Ormie Molyneux who discovered the most complete cranial specimens.

== Description ==
Smith and Kear concluded that Spoochelys was a small bodied (roughly 400–500 mm in length) likely terrestrial genus. They also noted that it may have had the ability to retract its neck and 'strike', similar to modern pleurodires as a possible predatory or defensive response. Most notably, it is speculated that Spoochelys possibly bore a 'club-like' caudal ossification similar to genera such as Meiolania.

== Classification ==
In 2017, Joyce et al. recovered Spoochelys as a member of Perichelydia. A cladogram is presented below:

- Mesochelydia
  - †Kayentachelys
  - - †Condorchelys
    - - - †Heckerochelys
        - - †Eileanchelys
          - †Indochelys
      - Perichelydia
        - †Meiolaniidae
        - †Spoochelys
        - - †Sichuanchelyidae
          - †Chubutemys
          - - †Helochelydridae
