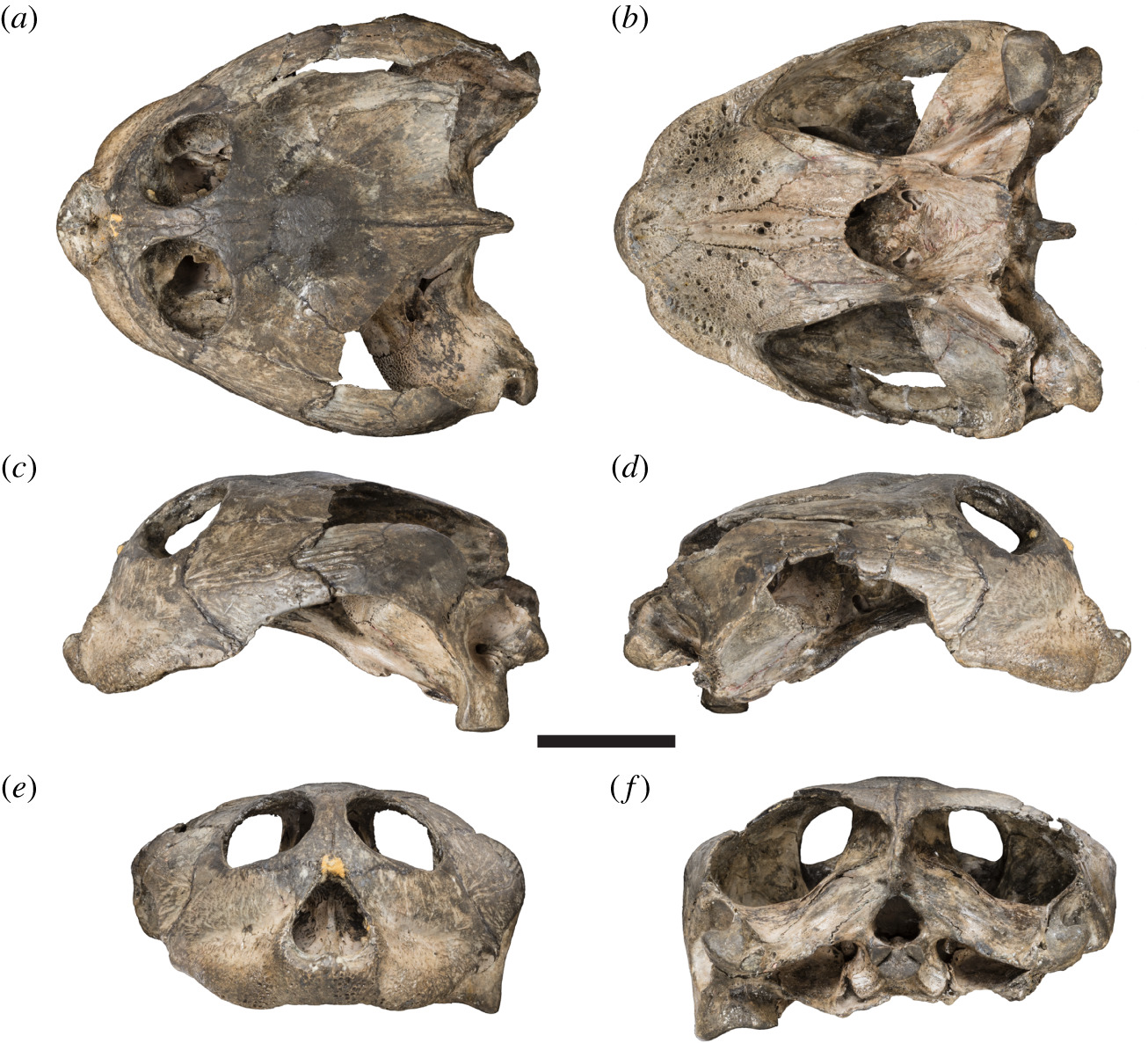
- Skull of Sandownia harrisi

Scientific classification
- Kingdom: Animalia
- Phylum: Chordata
- Class: Reptilia
- Clade: Pantestudines
- Clade: Testudinata
- Clade: Perichelydia
- Clade: †Thalassochelydia
- Family: †Sandownidae; Tong & Meylan, 2013

Genera
- Angolachelys; Brachopsemys; Leyvachelys; Sandownia

= Sandownidae =

Sandownidae Temporal range: Barremian–Paleocene

Extinct family of turtles

Sandownidae is a family of extinct marine turtles from the Cretaceous and Paleogene distributed around the Atlantic Ocean and adjacent areas. The family is defined as all taxa closer to the type genus Sandownia than to Pelomedusa, Testudo, Solnhofia, Eurysternum, Plesiochelys, Thalassemys or Protostega, a definition that encompasses the previous concept of the clade while also excluding it from being synonymous with other clades of modern or extinct marine turtles. Sandownidae may be within the larger clade Angolachelonia, defined as inclusive of Angolachelys and Solnhofia, sister to the entirely Late Jurassic marine group Thalassochelydia, although the concepts of the clades may shift with further phylogenetic analysis.

== Genera ==
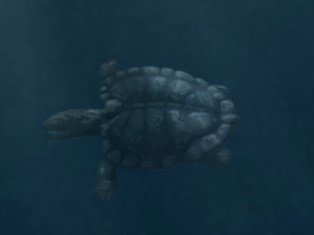
Angolachelys mbaxi

- Sandownia Meylan et al. 2000 Atherfield Clay Formation, England, Early Cretaceous (Aptian)
- Brachyopsemys Tong and Meylan 2013 Ouled Abdoun Basin, Morocco, Paleocene (Danian)
- Angolachelys Mateus et al. 2009 Itombe Formation, Angola, Late Cretaceous (Coniacian)
- Leyvachelys Cadena 2015 Paja Formation, Colombia, Early Cretaceous (Barremian) Glen Rose Formation, Texas, Early Cretaceous, (Albian)

== Phylogeny ==
After Evers and Benson, 2018:

- Testudinata
  - basal stem-group turtles
  - - Meiolaniformes
    - - Paracryptodira
      - - Xinjiangchelyidae
        - - Sinemydidae/Macrobaenidae
          - - Testudines
              modern turtles
            - Angolachelonia
              - Thalassochelydia
              - Sandownidae
                - Brachyopsemys
                - - Leyvachelys
                  - Sandownia
