= Itombe Formation =

Geological formation of the Kwanza Basin in Angola

- Stratigraphic range: Coniacian
- Type: Geological formation
- Sub-units: Tadi Beds
- Underlies: N'Golome Marl
- Overlies: Cabo Ledo & Massangano Formations
- Thickness: up to 600 m (2,000 ft)

Lithology
- Primary: Shale
- Other: Limestone, siltstone, sandstone

Location
- Coordinates: 8.2°S 13.2°E
- Approximate paleocoordinates: 23.0°S 1.4°E
- Region: Bengo
- Country: Angola
- Extent: Kwanza Basin
- Itombe Formation (Angola)

The Itombe Formation is a geological formation of the Kwanza Basin in Angola dated to the Coniacian stage of the Late Cretaceous. The environment of deposition is shallow marine. Reptile fossils have been recovered from the Tadi beds locality within the formation, including the dinosaur Angolatitan, the mosasaurs Angolasaurus and Mosasaurus iembeensis and the turtle Angolachelys. The Itombe formation was formerly considered Turonian in age, but new data suggests to be Coniacian.

== See also ==
- List of fossiliferous stratigraphic units in Angola
- Geology of Angola
- Santos Formation
