= Inversion (geology) =

Uplift of a sedimentary basin

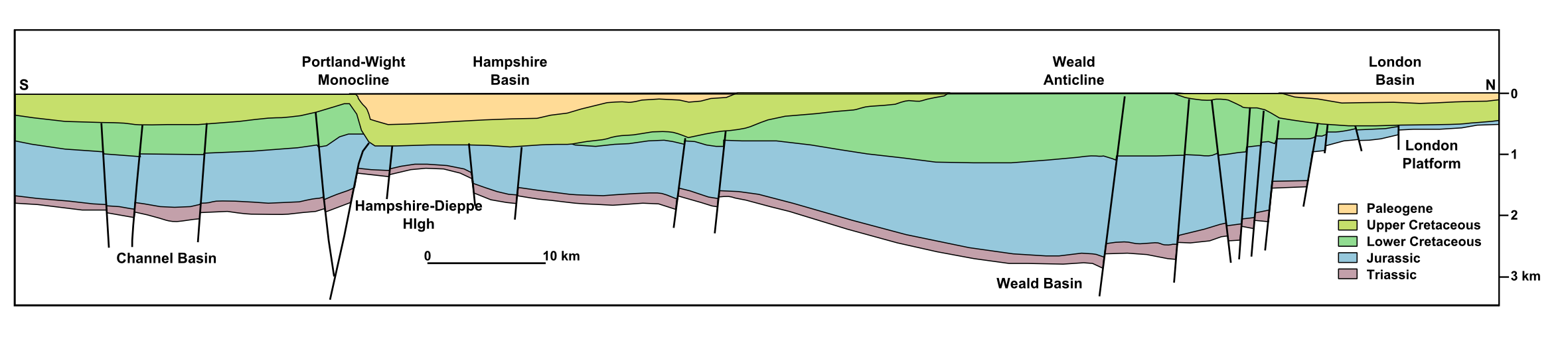
Section across southern England showing the inverted nature of the Channel and Weald basins

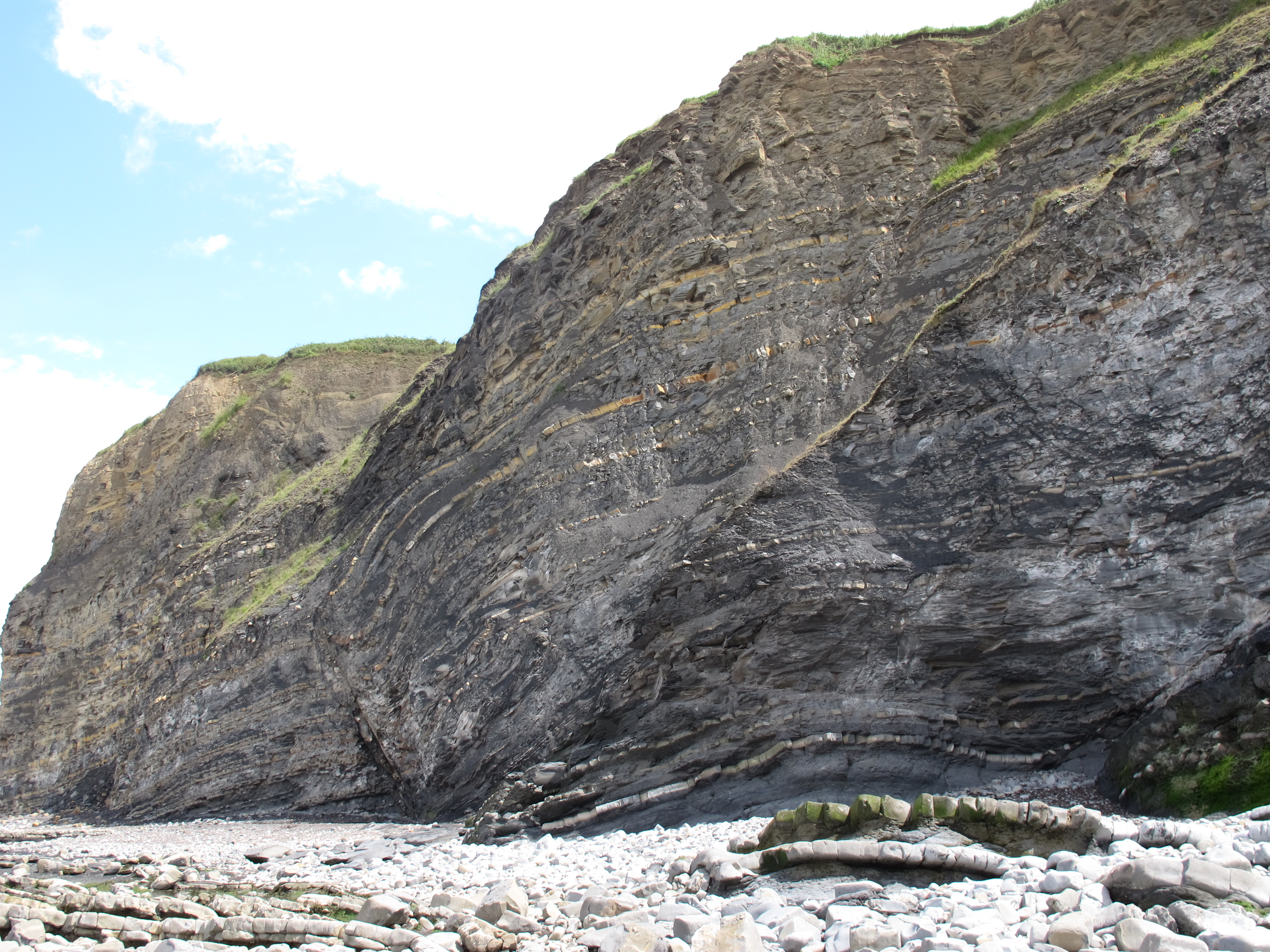
The Quantocks Head Fault, west of Kilve, Somerset, showing the effects of inversion on the earlier normal fault, with folding and thrusting in the hanging wall

In structural geology, inversion or basin inversion relates to the relative uplift of a sedimentary basin or similar structure as a result of crustal shortening. This normally excludes uplift developed in the footwalls of later extensional faults, or uplift caused by mantle plumes. "Inversion" can also refer to individual faults, where an extensional fault is reactivated in the opposite direction to its original movement.

The term negative inversion is also occasionally used to describe the reactivation of reverse faults and thrusts during extension.

The term "inversion" simply refers to the fact that a relatively low-lying area is uplifted – the rock sequence itself is not normally inverted.

== Formation ==
Many inversion structures are caused by the direct reactivation of pre-existing extensional faults. In some cases only the deeper parts of the fault are reactivated and the shortening is accommodated over a much broader area in the shallow part of the section. The existing fault block still generally acts as a boundary to the uplift and the process is sometimes known as buttressing.

The likelihood of fault reactivation depends on the dip of the existing fault plane. Lower angle faults are more favourable as the resolved shear stress on the plane is higher. When a listric fault, which increases in dip upwards, reactivates the uppermost part of the fault may be too steep and new reverse faults typically develop in the footwall of the existing fault. These are known as footwall shortcuts.

=== Varieties of formation ===
Inversion tectonics is recognised to form as a result of:

- Regional temporal variations in stress patterns within plates, resulting from forces caused by changes in plate boundary configuration, the blocking of subduction zones by buoyant crust (collision) and changes in relative motion at nearby plate boundaries.
- Global, episodic, intraplate, stress changes from deviatoric compression during the collisional assembly of Pangaea-type continental configurations to deviatoric tension in assembled configurations to deviatoric compression in dispersed configurations. Inversions are commonly associated with rifted margin breakup unconformities caused by the transition from rift-phase tension to ridge push compression.
- Local inversion in strike-slip rhombohedral pull-aparts as a natural consequence of alternating phases of transtension with negative flower structureand transpression with positive flower structure.
- Complex alternating phases of extension and shortening at the margins of upper crustal rotational flakes in strike-slip zones.
- Progressive diminution of the ratio of crustal to lithospheric thickness during slow extension causing whole basin uplift.
- Uplift on lithospheric flexural arches and hotspots.
- Body force mechanisms including salt mud diapirism, salt/mud decollement tectonics, gravity spreading, sliding and consequent relaying of heel extension to toe thrusting.
- Inversion of strong negative isostatic gravity anomalies in confined deep basins caused by upper crustal stretching. Critical to whether a basin becomes inverted are, also, the timing of a compression phase relative to the initial basin-forming extensional event and the extensional strain rate. Short extension-compression intervals and high extensional strain rates facilitate basin inversion. Inversion may be prevented by long intervals and low strain rates.

== Economic importance ==
Anticlinal structures formed by inversion provide traps in many of the world's hydrocarbon provinces. The nature of inversion means that reservoir units often thicken and may increase in quality within the basin that is later inverted (e.g. the Ormen Lange gas field offshore mid-Norway).
