= Geology of Angola =

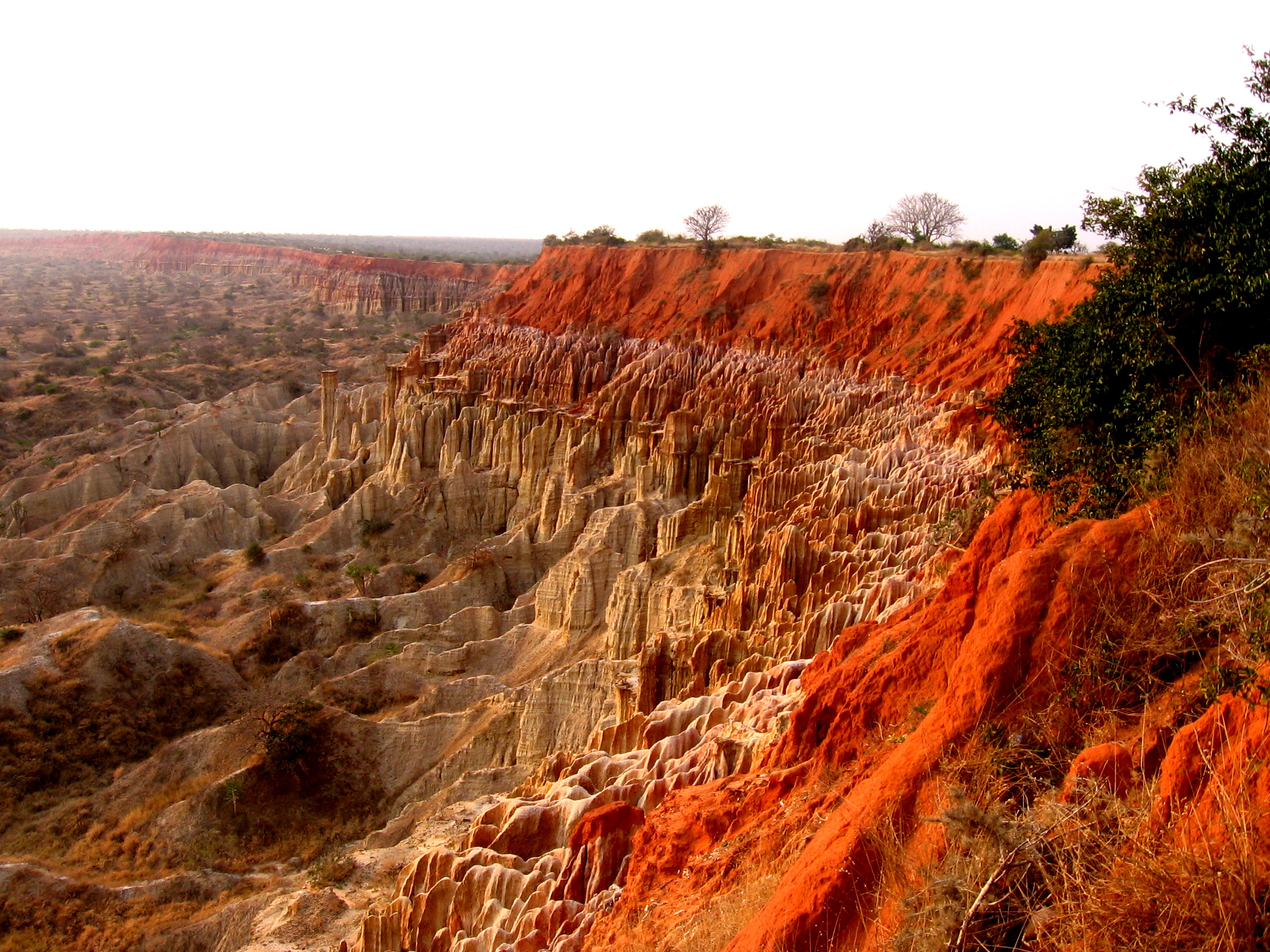
Erosion created cliffs at Miradouro da Lua.

The geology of Angola includes large areas of Precambrian age rocks. The west of the country is characterized by meta-sedimentary rocks of Proterozoic age including tillites assigned to the Bembe System. Overlying these are a thick pile of limestones and other marine sediments laid down during the Mesozoic and Cenozoic eras. Amidst the Proterozoic sequence are areas of crystalline basement dating from the Archaean. More Archaean basement rocks form the Kasai Craton in northeastern Angola. In the north, within the Cassanje Graben are clastic sediments and volcanic rocks of the Karoo Supergroup. Kimberlites and carbonatites resulting from magmatic activity during the Karoo period are found along a northeast-southwest line through the country. Continental sediments of the Kalahari Group are widespread in eastern Angola.

== Fossils ==
The Mesozoic of Angola is very rich of fossil vertebrates, namely marine reptiles such as turtles (Angolachelys), mosasaurs and plesiosaurs, related with the opening of South Atlantic. Only a couple of terrestrial fossils have been collected, including the unique dinosaur Angolatitan adamastor.

== Geohazards ==
Aquifers and ground water have been polluted due mining activities in the country.

== Economic geology ==
The larger part of Angola's income derives from oil production and by 2008 the country was Africa's second largest producer of crude petroleum. Angola is also the fourth largest producer of diamonds in Africa. Diamonds are obtained both from alluvial deposits and from the hundreds of kimberlite pipes which are scattered along a northeast – southwest line through Angola. The country is also a gold producer, the most important source being alluvium originating from Archaean greenstones dominantly around Cabinda. Angola also has, as yet largely untapped, copper, gypsum, phosphate, iron ore, manganese and other base metal reserves.
