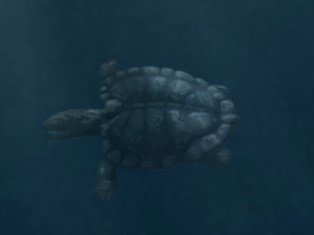
- Angolachelys mbaxi

Scientific classification
- Domain: Eukaryota
- Kingdom: Animalia
- Phylum: Chordata
- Class: Reptilia
- Clade: Pantestudines
- Clade: Testudinata
- Clade: Mesochelydia
- Clade: Perichelydia
- Clade: †Angolachelonia; Mateus et al., 2009

Subgroups
- Sandownidae; Thalassochelydia

= Angolachelonia =

Angolachelonia Temporal range: Late Jurassic to Paleogene, Oxfordian–Paleocene

Extinct clade of turtles

Angolachelonia is a clade of extinct turtles from the Late Jurassic to Paleogene of Eurasia. The group is defined as all taxa derived from the ancestor of the type genus Angolachelys and Solnhofia, a definition that could potentially encompass a clade of entirely marine turtles. Angolachelonia was originally inclusive of only Solnhofia, Angolachelys and Sandownia when originally conceived by Octavio Mateus and colleagues in 2009, but later phylogenetic analyses by Serjocha Evers and Roger Benson in 2018 unites the family Sandownidae, including Angolachelys and Sandownia among other taxa, with the entirely Late Jurassic clade Thalassochelydia, where Solnhofia may be a basal member. While the placement of Solnhofia is weak and the clade that Angolachelonia represents may change with further analysis, the clade of Sandownidae and Thalassochelydia is well-supported, and does not collapse despite the uncertain evolutionary history of the group. Three alternative potential origins of Angolachelonia sensu Evers and Benson are shown below.

- Testudinata
  - basal stem-group turtles
  - - Xinjiangchelyidae
    - - Sinemydidae/Macrobaenidae
      - - Angolachelonia
        - Testudines
          - Pleurodira
          - - non-chelonioid cryptodires
            - Chelonioidea

- Testudinata
  - basal stem-group turtles
  - - Xinjiangchelyidae
    - - Sinemydidae
      - Testudines
        - Pleurodira
        - - non-chelonioid cryptodires
          - - Macrobaenidae
            - - Angolachelonia
              - Chelonioidea

- Testudinata
  - basal stem-group turtles
  - - Xinjiangchelyidae
    - - Sinemydidae/Macrobaenidae
      - Testudines
        - Pleurodira
        - - non-chelonioid cryptodires
          - - Angolachelonia
            - Chelonioidea

A 2021 study found more evidence for Sandownidae and Thalassochelydia being close to one another, and found that Protostegidae may also be closely linked to the group.
