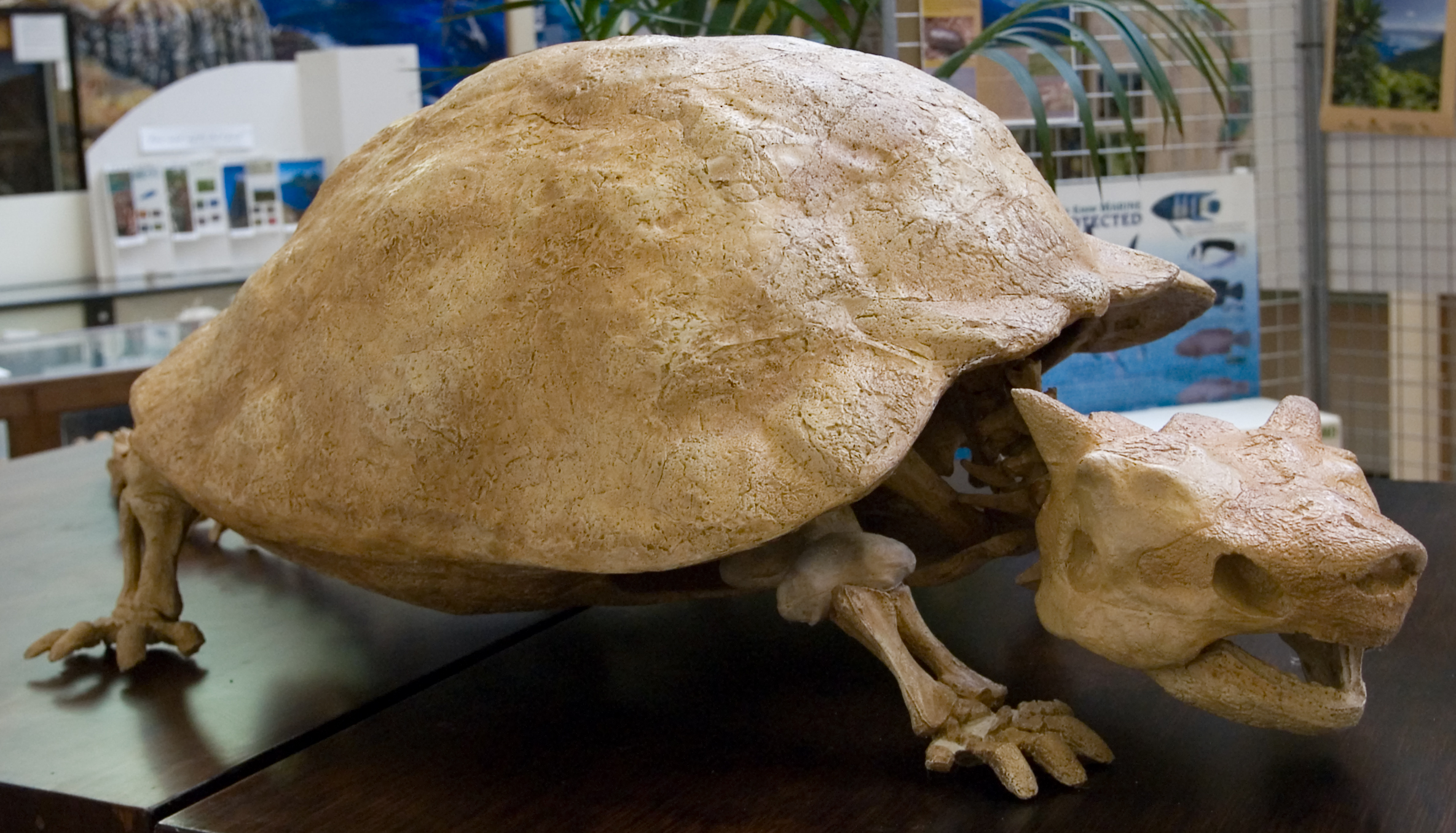
- Meiolania

Scientific classification
- Kingdom: Animalia
- Phylum: Chordata
- Class: Reptilia
- Clade: Pantestudines
- Clade: Testudinata
- Clade: Perichelydia
- Clade: †Meiolaniformes; Sterli and de la Fuente, 2013

Families and genera
- †Chubutemys; †Otwayemys; †Patagoniaemys; †Peligrochelys; †Trapalcochelys; †Meiolaniidae

= Meiolaniformes =

Meiolaniformes Temporal range: Early Cretaceous to Holocene 122–0.003 Ma

Extinct clade of reptiles

Meiolaniformes is an extinct clade of stem-group turtles, defined as all taxa more closely related to Meiolania than to Cryptodira and Pleurodira. It is known from the Early Cretaceous to the Holocene of Australia, Oceania and South America. Some Eurasian taxa have been suggested to be part of the group, but this is disputed.

The oldest member of Meiolaniformes is Australian Early Cretaceous Otwayemys.

== Taxonomy ==
The clade as currently defined contains the following taxa:

- †Chubutemys Gaffney et al. 2007 - Aptian, Cerro Barcino Formation, Argentina
- †Otwayemys Gaffney et al. 1998- Aptian, Eumeralla Formation, Australia
- †Patagoniaemys Sterli and de la Fuente 2011 Upper Campanian-Lower Maastrichtian, La Colonia Formation, Argentina
- †Peligrochelys Sterli and de la Fuente 2011 Danian, Salamanca Formation, Argentina
- †Trapalcochelys Sterli et al. 2013 Upper Campanian, Allen Formation, Argentina
- †Meiolaniidae Lydekker 1887, Eocene to Holocene, Argentina and Australia and Oceania

It has also been suggested that Mongolochelys, Sichuanchelys, and Kallokibotion from the Late Cretaceous of Mongolia, China and Europe respectively are part of this group, but other studies find these taxa in a more derived position nearer crown Testudines. Regardless, all taxa are members of Perichelydia.
