= Angola Basin =

Basin in the West African South Atlantic Margin

Coordinates: 15°16′35.5″S 3°20′43.2″E

Location of the Angola Basin off the southwest coast of Africa

The Angola Basin is located along the West African South Atlantic Margin which extends from Cameroon to Angola. It is characterized as a passive margin that began spreading in the south and then continued upwards throughout the basin. This basin formed during the initial breakup of the supercontinent Pangaea during the early Cretaceous, creating the Atlantic Ocean and causing the formation of the Angola, Cape, and Argentine basins. It is often separated into two units: the Lower Congo Basin, which lies in the northern region and the Kwanza Basin which is in the southern part of the Angola margin. The Angola Basin is famous for its "Aptian Salt Basins," a thick layer of evaporites that has influenced topography of the basin since its deposition and acts as an important petroleum reservoir.

== Tectonic mechanisms ==
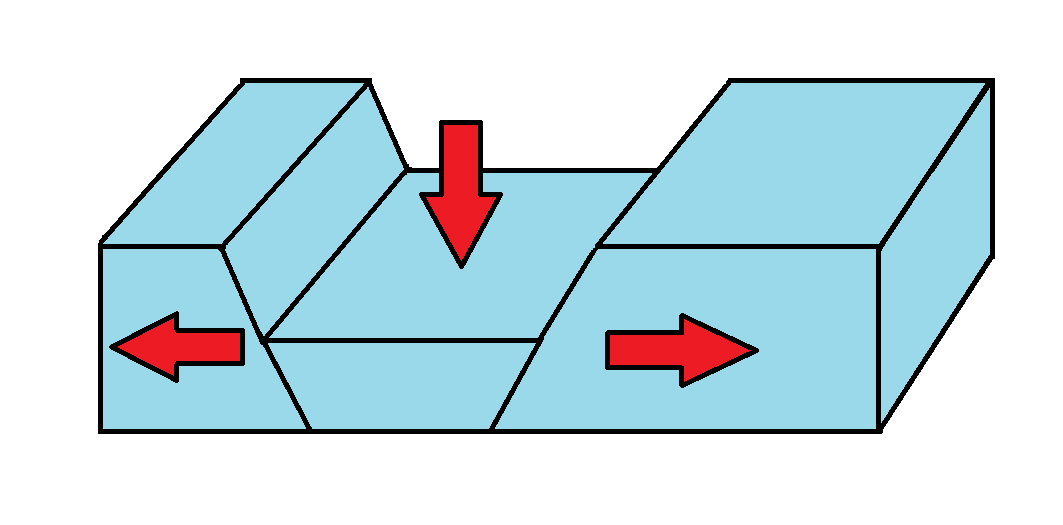
Gravity spreading mechanism based on Peel 2014

Typically divergent boundaries are described as having landward extension, seaward contraction, and translation, however the order of events in this area are difficult to distinguish in such a clear-cut manner. This is due to the fact that areas of the basin are superimposed upon one another, which some interpret to show pulses of deformation and uplift that occur at irregular times and places.

=== Gravity spreading ===
The Angola Basin is also highly characterized by gravity spreading where energy is released when the center of gravity lowers as crustal material thins. This spreading mechanism requires at least some deformation as opposed to the breakup of rigid blocks. Gravity spreading is also temporally linked to sediment deposition, so spreading rates should increase during times of high sediment deposition and decrease or halt when there is little to no sediment deposition. As a result, any accommodation space created as the margin continues to spread should be filled with sediments.

=== Salt tectonics ===
The evaporite layer present within the basin is responsible for many topographic features that developed since its deposition as salt movement deforms the surrounding bedrock. The driving force behind salt tectonics is thought to be extension governed by gravity. As gravity spreading acts upon the salt layers it causes upslope extension and downslope contraction, which also explains many of the folds and features of the basin. Seismic profiles taken from offshore Angola show many different salt structures such as diapirs, clines, turtle features, and salt walls that show several deformation phases as the salt squeezes upwards when it is deposited upon. Many of the salt forms are associated with early Cretaceous folding and uplift as well as lateral shortening. One of the signature features in the Angola Basin are deep troughs that developed as salt dissolved, creating space for sediment fill. The troughs range from the beginning of the Eocene to the end of the Miocene depending on the time of dissolution.

=== Raft tectonics ===
Post-rift deformation is predominantly caused by raft tectonics, a term that is associated with salt detachment when normal fault blocks are widely separated so that the footwall and hanging wall are not in contact, creating large grabens. It is considered one of the most extreme forms of extension, and it highly influenced by gravity spreading and increased sediment loading, major factors which act upon the Angola Basin. In the basin this tectonic mechanism is attributed to three periods of high strain that occurred at approximately 96, 28, and 10 million years ago, and the most recent high strain activity is still ongoing. These high strain rates lasted anywhere from 15 to 36 million years while rafting itself lasted from 7-10 million years.

== Geologic history ==
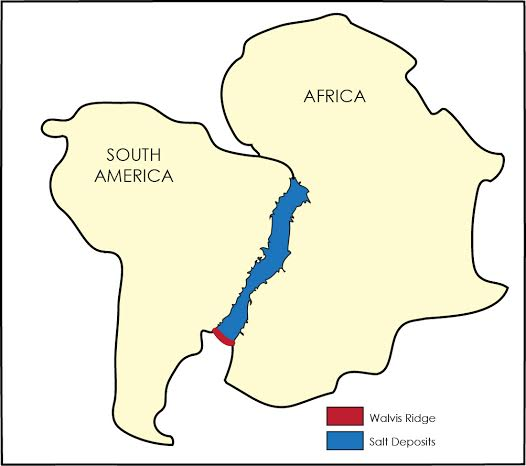
Overview of the rifting in the Cretaceous, approximately 120 million years ago, and placement of salt deposits and the Walvis Ridge adapted from Naafs and Pancost 2014

=== Mesozoic ===
The formation of the Angola Basin can be divided into three phases of rifting which took place from approximately 145-113 million years ago from the Jurassic to the Cretaceous. Initial rifting is defined by widespread crustal thinning, normal faulting, and the subsidence of grabens that formed in the upper crust. This was followed by a second rifting phase which was dominated by lithospheric thinning. The final phase of rifting led to the breakup of the lithosphere, initiated seafloor spreading that still acts today, and resulted in the development of oceanic crust.

After the rifting, salt deposited upon the preexisting bedrock. The large amounts of salt in most of the basin make it difficult to determine structures and sedimentary deposits beneath it since seismic does not penetrate through it. Though the salt layer creates some ambiguity most agree that the bedrock is composed of volcanic basalts which are likely a result of rifting or Precambrian crystalline rock. There are two main theories for the environment which called for salt deposition. The first is that the environment was a shallow marine area which after anomalous subsidence events causes rapid salt accumulation. The second hypothesis claims that salt filled a topographic depression much further below sea level. Despite which theory may be correct, it is generally agreed that the basin must have been very restricted from the ocean which allowed the evaporite deposits to be nearly three kilometers thick.

After the salt layer was deposited it was covered by a carbonate layer approximately 112 million years ago. The carbonate formation occurred due to large-scale anoxic events which created organic-rich shales. During this time the basin was hypersaline making it inhospitable for normal marine life, although there may have been a small but stable amount of input of terrestrial fresh water. The source of this freshwater as well as clastic debris was likely from the Kouilou-Niari River which is located in present-day Congo. As the rift continued to spread apart Pangaea into the South American and African continents, the Angola Basin opened up further, allowing for better ocean circulation which balanced out the extreme hypersaline conditions to allow for life to develop in the area. Towards the end of the Cretaceous the Congo River began to fill the basin with terrigenous sediments, characterized by many turbidite deposits which replaced most of the carbonate deposits.

Angola Basin Stratigraphy
Period	Time Interval (Ma)	Sediment Type
Quaternary	15-present	Siltstone/Sandstone
Neogene	34-15	Siltstone/Sandstone
Paleogene	100-34	Shale
Cretaceous	112-100	Carbonates
Cretaceous	117-112	Evaporites

=== Cenozoic ===
The Congo River created a much larger impact upon the basin in the Oligocene. The sedimentary fill from the Congo River created a large deep-sea fan where the river enters the ocean, and this fan is still one of the basin's most predominant features. The Oligocene is also characterized by an erosional event that lasted 10-20 million years that is thought to be controlled by upheavals or depressions of crust over a broad area that are caused by mantle convection and hotspot activity.

From the beginning of the Quaternary to present day much of the sediment is influenced by the Walvis Ridge, a hotspot trail that extends several hundred kilometers off the coast of Africa into the Atlantic Ocean, in addition to the Congo River. During this time the carbonate compensation depth, the depth at which carbonates dissolve, is at a minimum depth of 5400 m, over 1000 meters more than the average depth. This is due to the Walvis Ridge preventing cold Antarctic bottom waters from circulating the basin allowing for the sedimentation of carbonate materials, including microorganisms such as foraminifera and other calcareous microfossils. The Angola Basin is currently well circulated by warm and cold surface currents and undercurrents and is mostly influenced by the Benguela Current, the Equatorial Countercurrents, and the Angola Current.

== Subbasins ==
=== Lower Congo Basin ===
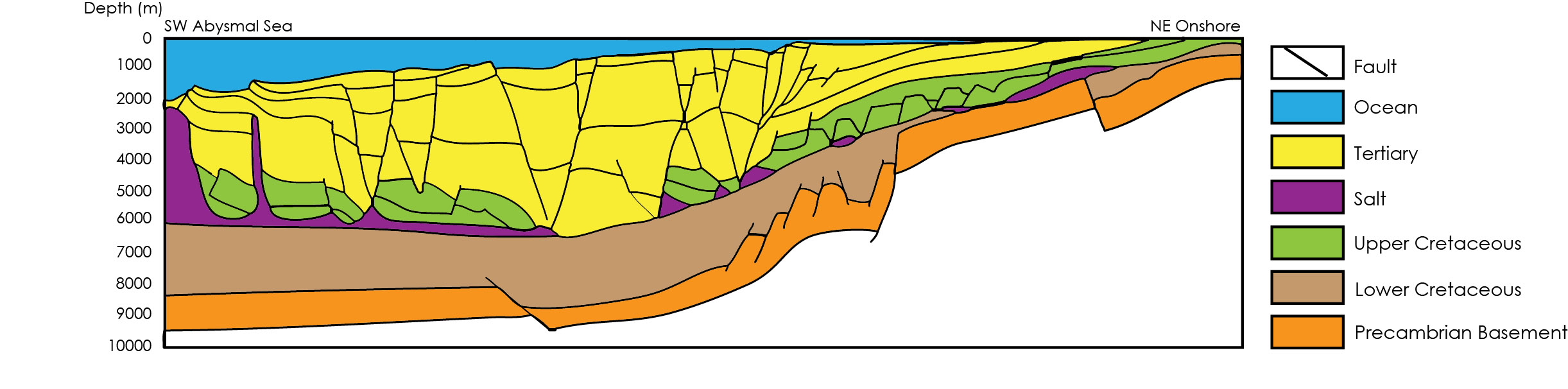
Cross section of the Angola Basin submarine fan from the southwest oceanwards end to the northeart onshore end adapted from Jiang, Wang, and Zheng 2014

The Lower Congo Basin lies in the northern region of the Angola Basin and is largely identified by a sedimentary fan that is fueled by the Congo River and is part of the Ogooue Delta. While the fan is dated to the Oligocene, initial sediment deposition which the fan developed on began in the Cretaceous and contains some of the Aptain salt layer. This fan is one of the largest marine fans in the world as it covers 300,000 square kilometers leading from the mouth of the river into the Atlantic Ocean. Since the fan is mainly composed of turbidite deposits composed for large amounts of sandstone and fine grained muds, it is likely an area that is currently generating hydrocarbons and probably has been for the past 30 million years. This feature is highly dominated by gravity flows where sediment and fluid flow down slope due to gravity.

=== Kwanza Basin ===
The Kwanza Basin lies in the lower region of the Angola Basin and can be divided into the inner and outer Kwanza Basins, with the inner basin lying closer to the continent of Africa and the outer basin surrounding the inner basin. Basement structures separate the inner and outer areas of the basin; these structures are named the Flamingo, Ametista, and Benguela Platforms which comprises the Atlantic hinge zone. These are areas where the signature salt layer is very thin or absent from the stratigraphic record. The basin's topographic features are mainly affected by salt tectonics, since the salt in most areas was originally over one kilometer thick. There are two main types of salt structures found in the inner Kwanza Basin: narrow salt walls which developed from salt-cored folds, and broad salt walls that formed likely due to major uplift in the area. Many of the salt features dissolved over time which led to the development of sedimentary troughs in the Cenozoic, although fewer troughs did develop as a result of extension.

== Hydrocarbons ==
The basin houses economically important hydrocarbon reservoirs that serve as a source of petroleum. Hydrocarbon generation in the Angola Basin is still an ongoing process that began in the late Cretaceous after the deposition of the thick salt beds. The salt is an important feature in preserving hydrocarbons as it seals in the reservoir and prevents it from escaping into the open water. Successful hydrocarbon collection within the Angola margin is associated with pockmarks within the topography that are formed as gas or subsurface water travels upwards through the water column. In December 2000 a research expedition collected gas hydrate specimens from one of the world's largest pockmarks located in the Congo-Angola Basin. The depression was 800 meters in diameter and located 3160 meters below sea level and developed as a result of several smaller pockmarks collapsing into each other. The majority of the hydrocarbons found were gas hydrates composed of 100% methane.
