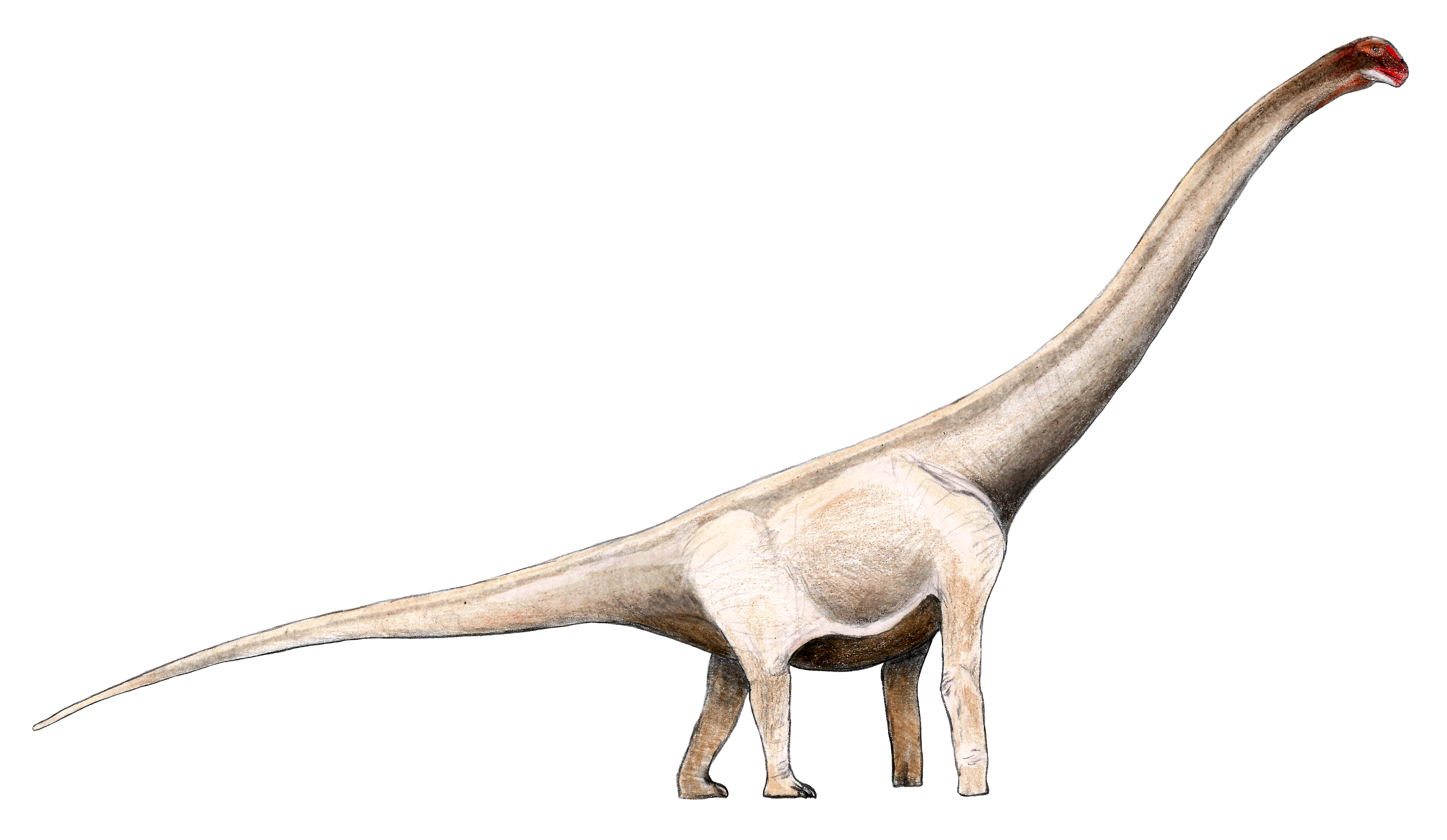
- Reconstruction

Scientific classification
- Kingdom: Animalia
- Phylum: Chordata
- Class: Reptilia
- Clade: Dinosauria
- Clade: Saurischia
- Clade: †Sauropodomorpha
- Clade: †Sauropoda
- Clade: †Macronaria
- Clade: †Somphospondyli
- Genus: †Angolatitan; Mateus et al., 2011

Type species
- Angolatitan adamastor Mateus et al., 2011

= Angolatitan =

Angolatitan Temporal range: Late Cretaceous, Coniacian

Extinct genus of titanosauriform dinosaurs

Angolatitan (meaning "Angolan giant") is a genus of titanosauriform sauropod dinosaur from the Upper Cretaceous. It is also the first non-avian dinosaur discovered in Angola. The genus contains a single species, Angolatitan adamastor, known from a partial right forelimb. Angolatitan was a relict form of its time; it was a Late Cretaceous basal titanosauriform, when more derived titanosaurs were far more common.

== Discovery and naming ==
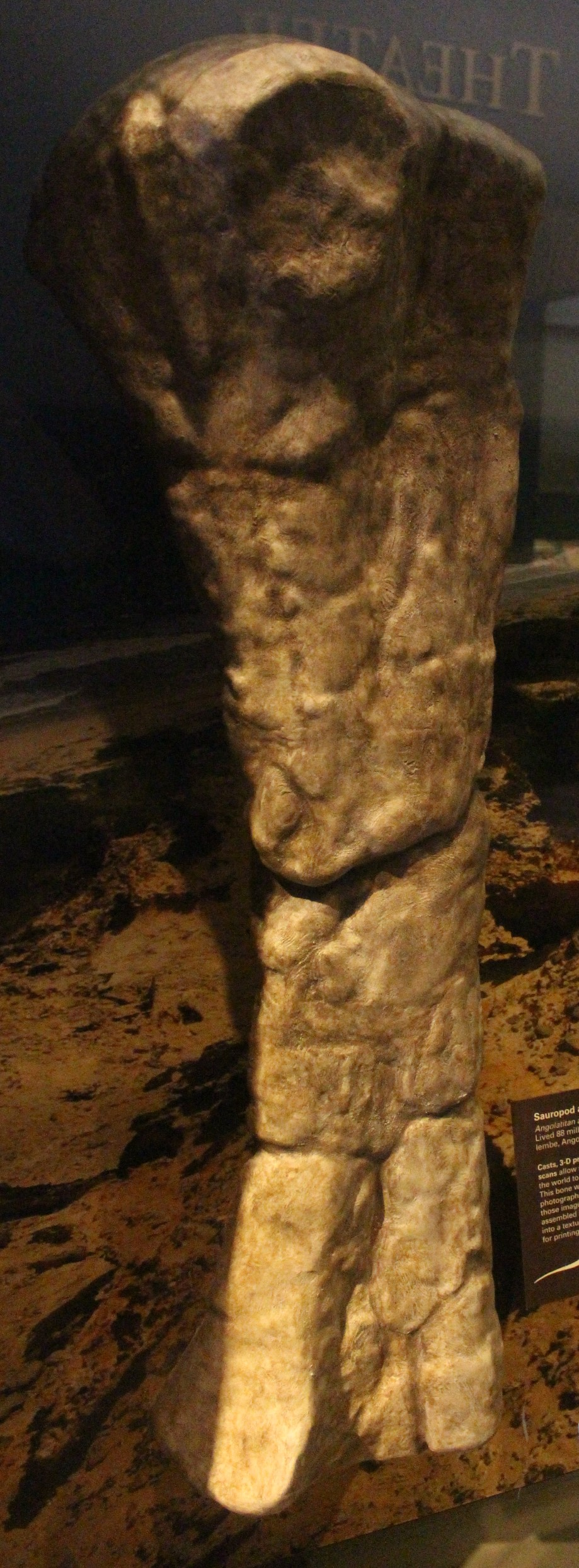
Cast of holotypic right humerus, National Museum of Natural History

During the Angolan Civil War, palaeontological field research was not possible in Angola. After the civil war ended in 2002, the PaleoAngola project planned the first Angolan palaeontological expeditions since the 1960s. The first of these expeditions started in 2005 to explore Angola's fossil rich upper Cretaceous rocks, leading to the discovery of Angolatitan. The discovery was made by Octávio Mateus on May the 25 near Iembe in the province of Bengo, and excavations were conducted during May and August 2006.

Angolatitan was described by Octávio Mateus and colleagues in 2011. The generic name means "Angolan giant". The specific name is derived from Adamastor, a mythological sea monster that represented the dangers Portuguese sailors faced in the southern Atlantic. Until 1975, Angola was a Portuguese colony.

== Description ==
The only specimen is a partial right forelimb, including shoulder blade, upper arm bone, the two bones of the lower arm (ulna and radius), and three metacarpals. These fossils (Field number MGUAN-PA-003) are stored in the Museu de Geologia of the Universidade Agostinho Neto in Luanda.

The upper arm bone measures 110 centimetres (43 in), the ulna 69 centimetres (27 in) in length. In general, the forelimb was less robust than in most of the more derived titanosaurs. The metacarpals were slender and equal in length; those of titanosaurs were more robust with varying lengths. Unlike titanosaurs, the olecranon was absent, and the first metacarpal was not bowed.

== Classification ==
Angolatitan was a basal titanosauriform, more derived than Brachiosaurus but less derived than Euhelopus and Titanosauria, which is notable given its relatively late appearance in the sauropod fossil record.

Recent phylogenetic tests run by Gorsack and Connor (2017) recover Angolatitan as a non-titanosaurian titanosauriform.

== Palaeoecology ==
The specimen was found in a 50 m thick subsection of the Itombe Formation called the Tadi Beds. The Itombe Formation was considered Turonian in age, but new data suggests that it dates to the Coniacian. These rocks were deposited under marginal marine conditions; fossils include ammonites, echinoderms, and fishes (including sharks). Tetrapods include the turtle Angolachelys mbaxi, the mosasaurs Angolasaurus bocagei and Tylosaurus iembeensis, and several plesiosaur fossils.

The ecosystem inhabited by Angolatitan would have been desert-like. Presumably, this sauropod would have been well adapted to very dry conditions, similar to extant desert elephants.
