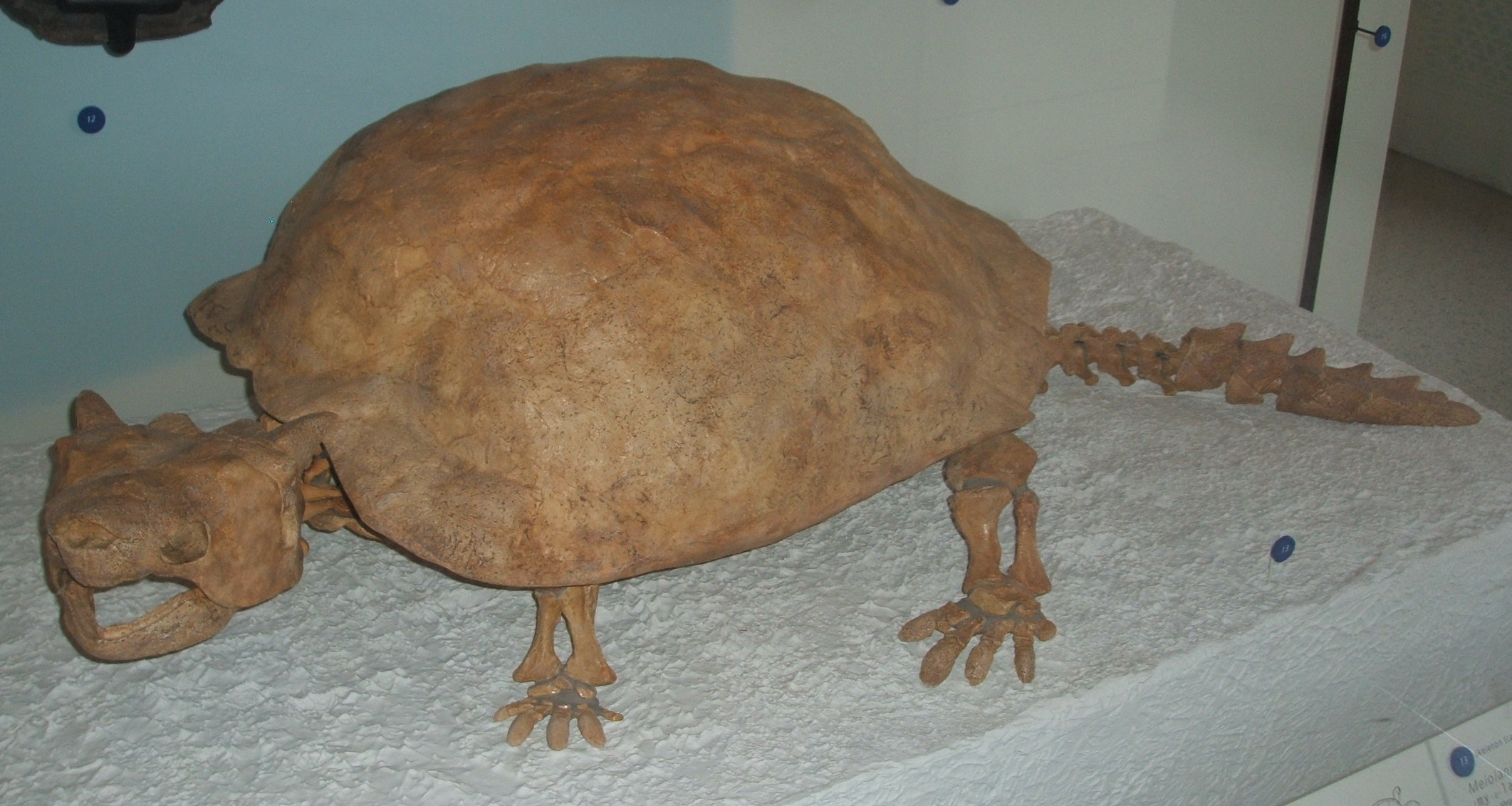
- Meiolania (Meiolaniidae)
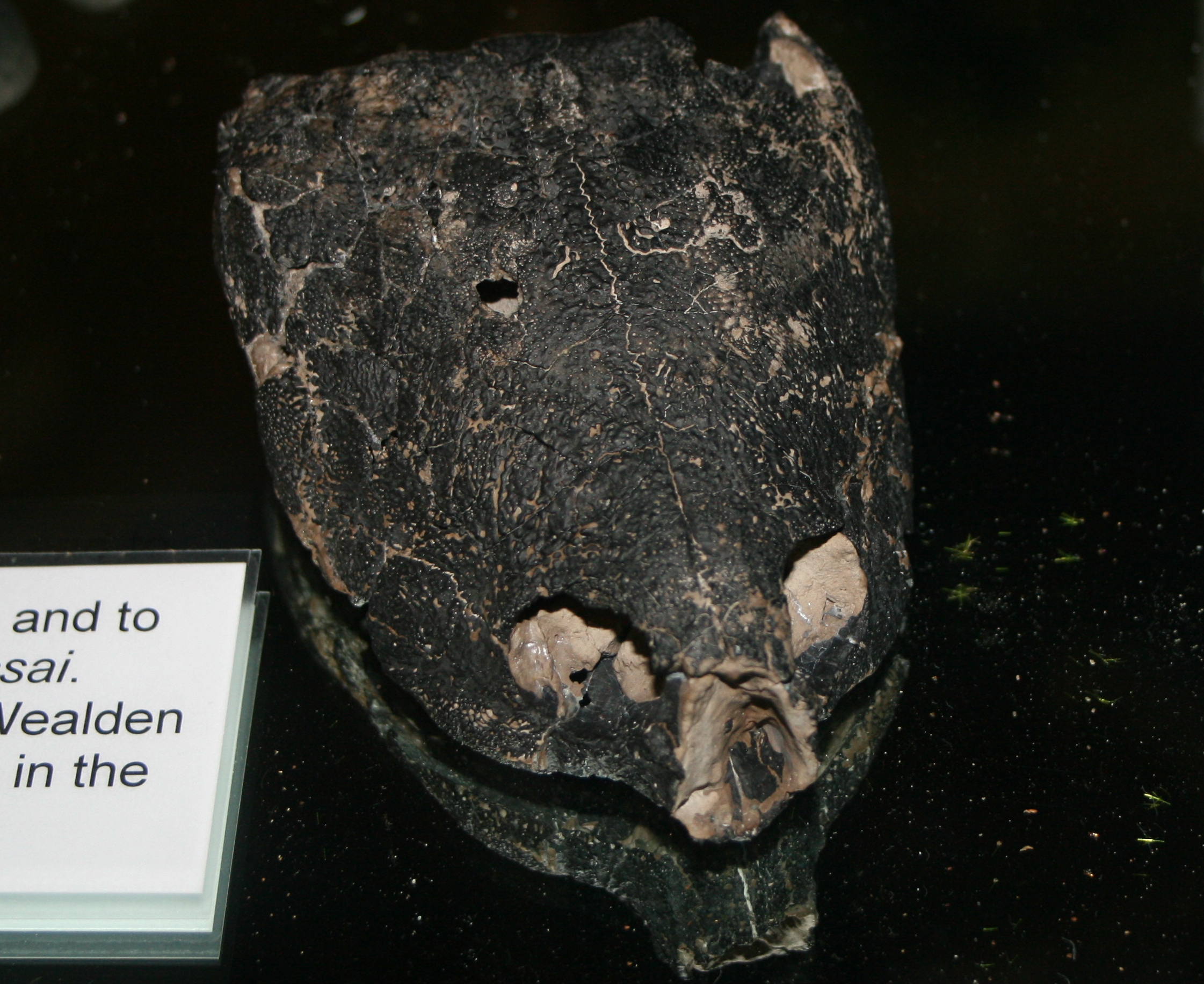
- Helochelydra skull (Helochelydridae)

Scientific classification
- Kingdom: Animalia
- Phylum: Chordata
- Class: Reptilia
- Clade: Pantestudines
- Clade: Testudinata
- Clade: Mesochelydia
- Clade: Perichelydia; Joyce, 2017

Subgroupings
- †Helochelydridae; †Meiolaniformes; †Sichuanchelyidae; †Kallokibotion; †Spoochelys; Testudines; Incertae sedis (may be within crown Testudines); †Paracryptodira; †Angolachelonia; †Macrobaenidae; †Sinemydidae; †Xinjiangchelyidae

= Perichelydia =

Perichelydia Temporal range: Middle Jurassic–Present

Clade of reptiles

Perichelydia (from Greek peri "near" and chelys "turtle") is a clade within Pantestudines (turtles and their extinct relatives) known from the Middle Jurassic to Holocene. Alongside crown group Testudines, it also contains Helochelydridae, which is known from the Cretaceous of Europe and North America, Sichuanchelyidae from the Middle Jurassic to Paleocene of Asia and Europe, Meiolaniformes, which is known from the Cretaceous to Holocene of South America, Australia and Oceania, and Spoochelys, known from the Mid-Cretaceous Griman Creek Formation of Australia. Kallokibotion from the Late Cretaceous of Europe is also considered part of this group. Several other groups, including the proposed clade Angolachelonia (containing Thalassochelydia and Sandownidae), Paracryptodira, Macrobaenidae, Sinemydidae and Xinjiangchelyidae, which are sometimes considered members of Cryptodira, have also been found outside crown Testudines in several analyses. These groups are usually considered to be closer to the crown group than the other members of Perichelydia.

The clade Perichelydia was created by W. G. Joyce in 2017. They are distinguished from other mesochelydians by two characters: the presence of processus trochlearis oticum and a closed interpterygoid vacuity.

Cladogram after Tong et al. 2022:

- Mesochelydia
  - †Kayentachelys
  - - †Condorchelys
    - - - †Heckerochelys
        - - †Eileanchelys
          - †Indochelys
      - Perichelydia
        - †Meiolaniidae
        - †Spoochelys
        - - †Sichuanchelyidae
          - †Chubutemys
          - - †Helochelydridae
            - - †Paracryptodira
              - †Compsemydidae
              - Crown group Testudines
                - - †Platychelyidae
                  - crown group Pleurodira (side-necked turtles)
                - - †Jurassichelon
                  - - †Solnhofia
                    - †Santanachelys
                    - - - †Portlandemys
                        - †Pleisochelys
                        - - - †Macrobaenidae
                            - †Xinjiangchelyidae
                          - crown group Cryptodira (hidden neck turtles, tortoises)

Cladogram of Perichelydia after Miller et al. 2023

- Perichelydia
  - †Mongolochelys
  - - †Meiolaniformes (Meiolania)
    - - †Paracryptodira
      - - †Sinemydidae+†Xinjiangchelyidae?
        - - - †Protostegidae?
            - †Thalassochelydia
          - - Pleurodira (side-necked turtles)
            - Pan‑Cryptodira
              - †Sinemydidae+†Xinjiangchelyidae?
              - Cryptodira (hidden-neck turtles)
                - Pan-Trionychia (soft-shelled and pig-nosed turtles)
                - - Pan-Testudinoidea (tortoises, pond turtles/terrapins, etc)
                  - - Pan-Chelonioidea (sea turtles, possibly including †Protostegidae)
                    - - Pan-Kinosternoidea (musk turtles, hickatee, etc)
                      - Chelydridae (snapping turtles)
