= Laurasichersis =

Laurasichersis Temporal range: Thanetian

Scientific classification
- Kingdom: Animalia
- Phylum: Chordata
- Clade: Pantestudines
- Clade: Testudinata
- Family: †Sichuanchelyidae
- Genus: †Laurasichersis; Pérez-García, 2020

Extinct genus of turtle

Laurasichersis is an extinct genus of turtle that lived in France during the Thanetian stage. It is known from a single species, L. relicta.
