= Chubutemys =

Chubutemys Temporal range: Early Cretaceous, 112 Ma

Scientific classification
- Kingdom: Animalia
- Phylum: Chordata
- Class: Reptilia
- Clade: Pantestudines
- Clade: Testudinata
- Clade: Perichelydia
- Clade: †Meiolaniformes
- Genus: †Chubutemys; Gaffney et al., 2007

Type species
- Chubutemys copelloi Gaffney et al., 2007

Extinct genus of turtles

Chubutemys was an extinct genus of meiolaniform turtle. It lived during the Early Cretaceous of Argentina, around the Albian-Aptian border, within the Puesto La Paloma Member of the Cerro Barcino Formation. It is known from most of the skeleton and carapace, and part of the skull.

== Description ==
A skeleton, including most of the skull, is known for Chubutemys. As the skull was found in the same quarry as the postcranial skeleton, it was decided to be likely to be from the same individual. The shell of the specimen is remarkably thin.

== Classification ==
Chubutemys is a turtle that is relatively easy to classify. Among related genera, Sterli et al. found Patagoniaemys to be the most unstable genus. The cladogram below shows the relationships of Chubutemys, and three possible placements of Patagoniaemys:

- Testudinata
  - Proganochelys quenstedti
  - - Proterochersis robusta
    - - Kayentachelys aprix
      - - - Patagoniaemys gasparinae
          - Eileanchelys waldmani
        - - Testudines
          - Meiolaniformes
            - Chubutemys copelloi
            - - - Patagoniaemys gasparinae
                - - Mongolochelys efremovi
                  - Pelogrochelys walshae
              - - - Patagoniaemys gasparinae
                  - - Otwayemys cuncularis
                    - Kallokibotion bajazidi
                - Meiolaniidae
                  - Niolamia argentina
                  - - Ninjemys oweni
                    - - Warkalania carinaminor
                      - Meiolania platyceps

== Paleoecology ==
Chubutemys is from the Cerro Barcino Formation. A locality of many turtles, nicknamed "Turtle Town", located within the Puesto La Paloma Member of the formation, contains fossils of Chubutemys. The formation includes many layers of pyrloclastic-rich rocks, and the different layers are many different colours. The layer inside the Puesto La Paloma Member, which is coloured green, was dated to the Albian-Aptian boundary.
