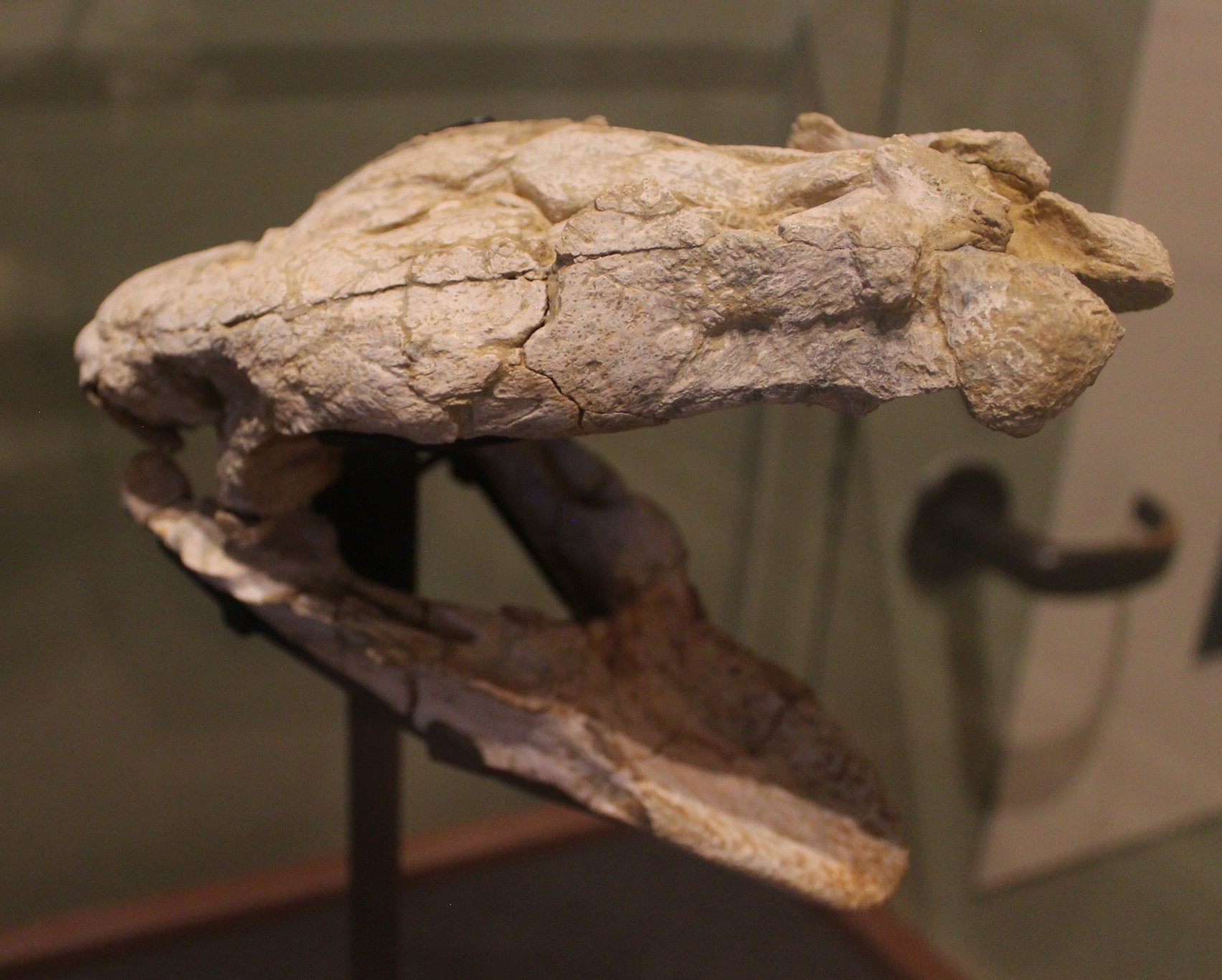
- A. mbaxi skull, National Museum of Natural History

Scientific classification
- Kingdom: Animalia
- Phylum: Chordata
- Class: Reptilia
- Clade: Pantestudines
- Clade: Testudinata
- Clade: †Thalassochelydia
- Family: †Sandownidae
- Genus: †Angolachelys; Mateus et al., 2009
- Species: †A. mbaxi

Binomial name
- †Angolachelys mbaxi Mateus et al., 2009

= Angolachelys =

Angolachelys Temporal range: Turonian

Extinct genus of turtles

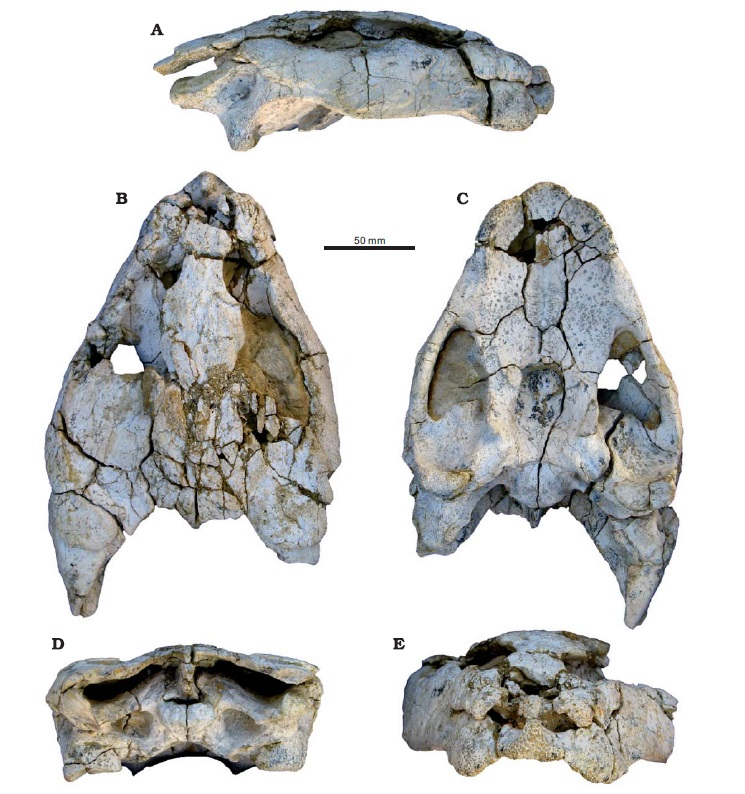
Skull in multiple views

Angolachelys is an extinct genus of African marine turtle which existed in Angola during the Turonian stage of the Late Cretaceous. The type species is Angolachelys mbaxi. The type MGUAN-PA includes skull, jaw, and postcranial fragments found in the Tadi Beds of the Itombe Formation.

== Phylogeny ==
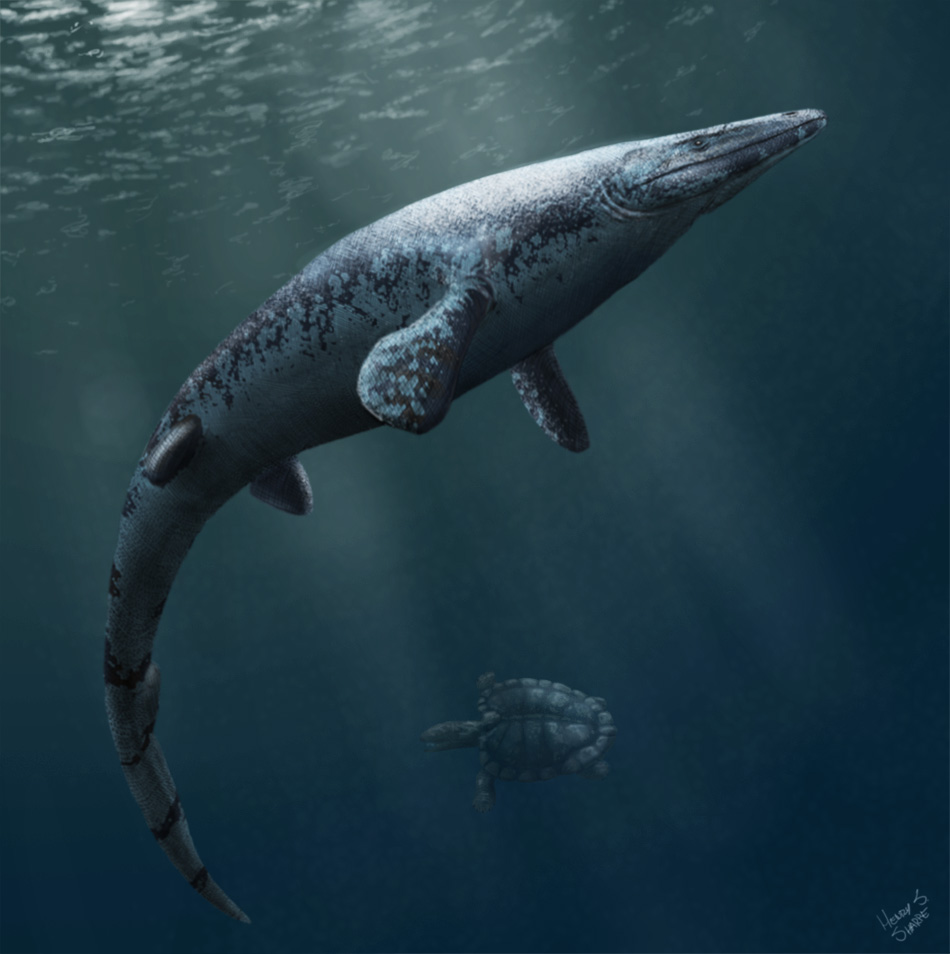
Life reconstruction of Angolasaurus alongside Angolachelys

Cladogram after Mateus et al. (2009).

- Eucryptodira
  - - Santanachelys
    - Thalassemys
  - - Portlandemys
    - - Plesiochelys
      - - Angolachelonia
          - Solnhofia
          - - GlenRose Turtle SMU
            - - Angolachelys
              - Sandownia
        - Other Eucryptodires
