= Gravity spreading =

Gravity spreading is a phenomenon in which a geological body laterally extends and vertically contracts to reduce its gravitational potential energy. It has been observed on many different scales, and at numerous locations on Earth, from rhyolite lava flows to passive margins. Additionally, gravity spreading is likely to have occurred on both Mars and Venus.

== Distinction from Gravity Gliding ==
Historically, geologists have used the terms "gravity spreading" and "gravity gliding" interchangeably, or with little distinction. This article follows the convention of "Excursus on gravity gliding and gravity spreading" by D.D. Schultz-Ela, which defines gravity spreading as a lateral extension and vertical contraction, which thus must be applied to a non-rigid body. Gravity gliding, however, is applied to a block that is not being deformed, and is therefore less common to observe. However, it can be difficult to distinguish between the two in real world scenarios, and often both occur simultaneously.

== Mechanism ==
For gravity spreading to occur, a rock mass must be driven to deformation by gravity. As long as the center of gravity of the system descends, portions of the system may rise. Of course, a material normally resists such deformation. For gravity spreading to occur, the differential stress must be greater than that rock body's yield strength. Gravity spreading can be thought of as a mound of molasses that spreads out, and gravity gliding can be imagined as a wooden block sliding down a slope.

== Examples ==
=== Earth ===
==== Mountains ====
Heart Mountain in Wyoming, United States, has been extensively studied, because Ordovician age carbonates (Madison Limestone), sit on top of a much younger (~50Ma) sedimentary formation (Willwood Formation). It is now largely accepted that this juxtaposition of old rocks on top of young is the result of gravity spreading and gliding. Field observations, such as slight internal deformations of the older formation, indicate the gravity gliding and spreading of the Madison Limestones. The specific details of the gravity spreading event are unclear, but it is thought that it was induced by the Laramide Orogeny, approximately 50 Ma. This caused the Madison Limestones to slide into the nearby Bighorn Basin, where it came to rest on top of the Willwood Formation. The cause for block motion is debated, with numerous models to explain how such a large block could have moved tens of kilometers down a slope of less than 2°. Models have ranged from lubrication by hydrothermal circulation, movement initiation from volcanogenic seismicity, to frictional heating dissociating CO_{2} from the carbonates, resulting in dramatically reduced friction. The last of these theories is among the most recent, and by far the most spectacular. The authors envisage initially slow sliding, likely as the result of a volcanic eruption, until frictional heating of the carbonate rocks creates a supercritical CO_{2} layer, decreasing the friction tremendously. From this point, the sliding would occur rapidly, perhaps as high as 150 km/h.

==== Passive Margins ====
Gravity spreading in passive margins occurs when gravitational forces are strong enough to overcome the overburdens resistance to motion along its basal surface, and the internal strength. The gravitational forces are a function of the dip of the slope and the dip of the décollement layer.

==== Lava Flows ====
Rhyolite lava flows in northeastern New South Wales, Australia show recumbent folds that record a history of vertical shortening and lateral extension during deposition, consistent with what one would expect from gravity spreading. This is the result of lava being displaced by new lava extruding from the vent.

=== Mars ===
Satellite images of Mars have shown that the Thaumasia Plateau has large amounts of thrust faults, normal faults, and ridges. This rifting has resulted in canyons, and compression at the front of the "mega-slide" has caused the ridges and thrust faults observed at low end of the region. To explain these faults and ridges, a four-stage model involving gravity spreading is used:

1. A thick salt layer is deposited. This is possible in either wet or dry conditions.
2. Tharsis, a volcanic plateau, was emplaced. This increased both the heat flux of the area, as well as the topographic slope. Volcanism associated with Tharsis also deposited ash and lava flows.
3. The layers of salt and ice beneath the volcanics provided detachment points for the initiation of gravity spreading to the southeast.
4. Fractures from the basal detachment plane opened an aquifer, resulting in the release of water and incision of outflow channels.

=== Venus ===
It has been suggested that the "blocky" surface of Venus is the result of gravity spreading. This is thought because of flow-like structures correlated with topography, and as well as potential regions of thermal uplift, and has been reinforced by terrestrial analogues.

== See also ==
- Creep (deformation)
- Downhill creep
- Slump
