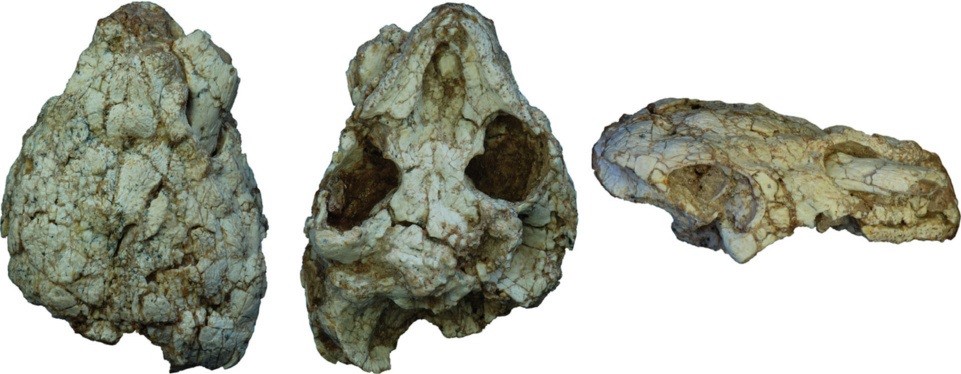
- Sichuanchelys skull in multiple views

Scientific classification
- Domain: Eukaryota
- Kingdom: Animalia
- Phylum: Chordata
- Class: Reptilia
- Clade: Pantestudines
- Clade: Testudinata
- Clade: Perichelydia
- Family: †Sichuanchelyidae

Genera
- Laurasichersis; Mongolochelys; Sichuanchelys

= Sichuanchelyidae =

Sichuanchelyidae Temporal range: Middle Jurassic–Late Paleocene

Extinct family of turtles

Sichuanchelyidae is a family of extinct turtles in the clade Testudinata. It includes all perichelydians that are more closely related to Sichuanchelys than Meiolania, Helochelydra, or any extant turtles.

== Systematics ==
The family Sichuanchelyidae was originally created to accommodate the Middle Jurassic Chinese turtle Sichuanchelys, and it was considered monotypic until Joyce et al. (2016) recovered the problematic Late Cretaceous turtle Mongolochelys from Mongolia as a close relative of Sichuanchelys. The late Paleocene form Laurasichersis from Europe is the youngest sichuanchelyid, showing that stem turtles in Laurasia outlived the Mesozoic.
