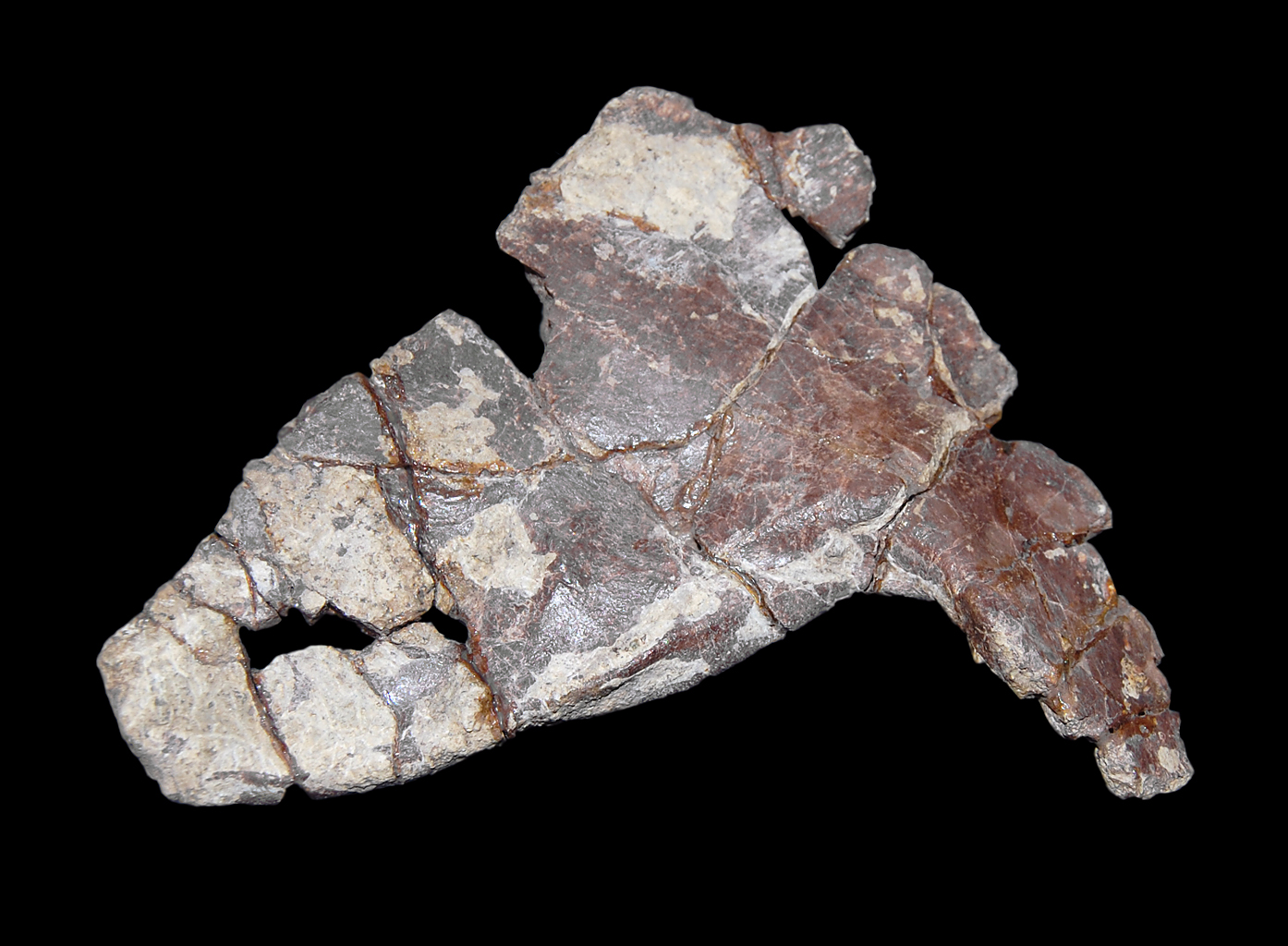
- Fossil carapace, Deva Natural History Museum

Scientific classification
- Kingdom: Animalia
- Phylum: Chordata
- Class: Reptilia
- Clade: Pantestudines
- Clade: Testudinata
- Clade: Perichelydia
- Family: †Kallokibotiidae
- Genus: †Kallokibotion; Nopsca, 1923
- Species: †K. bajazidi

Binomial name
- †Kallokibotion bajazidi Nopsca, 1923

Synonyms
- Kallokibotium bajazidi Nopsca, 1923; Kallokibotium manificum Nopsca, 1923; Thalassodromeus sebesensis Grellet-Tinner & Codrea, 2014

= Kallokibotion =

Kallokibotion Temporal range: Upper Cretaceous, 86–66 Ma

Extinct genus of turtles

Kallokibotion is an extinct genus of stem-turtle from the Upper Cretaceous (Santonian-Maastrichtian, 86–66 million years ago), known from fossils found in Romania. One species is known, Kallokibotion bajazidi, which was named by Franz Nopcsa after his lover Bajazid Doda. It literally means 'beautiful box of Bajazid'; Nopcsa chose the name because, in the words of British palaeontologist Gareth Dyke, "the shape of the shell reminded him of Bajazid's arse". Further undescribed species are known from the Santonian of Hungary and the Campanian aged Grünbach Formation of Austria. Turtles similar to Kallokibotion were reported from the Paleocene of France and the Lower Maastrichtian of Volgograd Oblast, Russia, but these similarities were dismissed later.

== Description ==
Kallokibotion reached 50 cm (1 ft 8 in) in carapace length. There are jagged ornaments on its shell.

== Taxonomy ==
A fossil of this turtle was mistakenly described as a pterosaur of the genus Thalassodromeus in 2014. In 1992, it was identified as a basal cryptodire, and as a meiolaniid in the early 2010's. Later phylogenetic analysis based on characters described from new specimens places Kallokibotion as the sister taxon of the crown testudines. A 2021 analysis placed Kallokibotion in Compsemydidae within Paracryptodira.
