= Nanomilleretta =

Nanomilleretta Temporal range: Late Permian, Wuchiapingian

Scientific classification
- Kingdom: Animalia
- Phylum: Chordata
- Class: Reptilia
- Family: †Millerettidae
- Genus: †Nanomilleretta; Broom & Robinson, 1948
- Species: †N. kitchingi

Binomial name
- †Nanomilleretta kitchingi Broom & Robinson, 1948

Extinct genus of early reptiles

Nanomilleretta (lit. 'small Milleretta') is an extinct genus of early reptile in the family Millerettidae, known from the Late Permian Cistecephalus Assemblage Zone of South Africa. The genus contains a single species, Nanomilleretta kitchingi, known from a partial skull described in 1948. The poor preservation of this specimen makes it difficult to observe its anatomy in detail. As such, some researchers have been unable to recognize unique features in this species, potentially making it a dubious taxon. The observable anatomy indicates it has proportionately large orbits, a short snout, and long, pointed teeth.

== History and identity ==
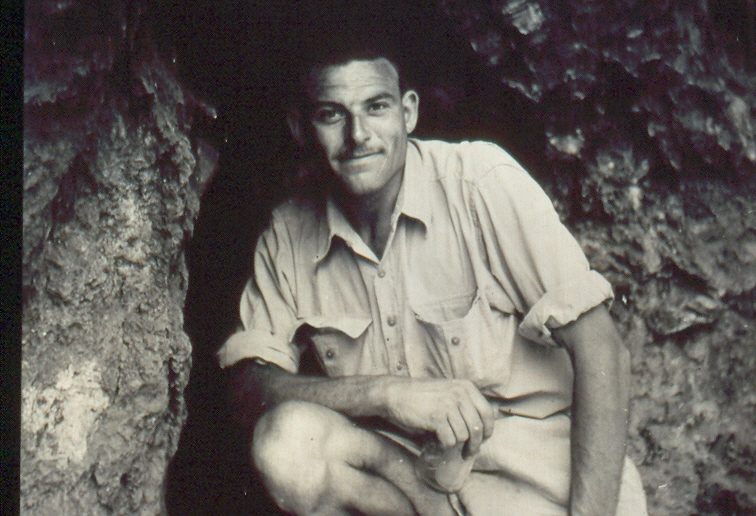
Photograph of James Kitching (1947), the discoverer and eponym of N. kitchingi

The Nanomilleretta fossil material was discovered in 1945 by James Kitching and his brother Ben in rock outcrops on Houdkonstant Farm, 25 kilometres (16 mi) north of Graaff-Reinet (Robert Sobukwe). The specimen consists of a small skull that is slightly crushed and extensively weathered. It is housed at the Evolutionary Studies Institute (previously the Bernard Price Institute for Palaeontological Research (BPI)) in Johannesburg, where it is permanently accessioned as specimen BP/1/7.

In 1948, Robert Broom and John T. Robinson described these fossil remains as belonging to a new genus and species, which they named Nanomilleretta kitchingi. They established BP/1/7 as the holotype specimen. The generic name, Nanomilleretta, combines the Greek word νάνος (nanos), meaning 'small' or 'dwarf', with the genus name of the closely-related Milleretta, in turn named after Scottish geologist Hugh Miller. The specific name, kitchingi, honors the discoverers of the holotype. Broom and Robinson noted that, despite the eroded nature of this specimen, sufficient detail could be recognized—particularly on the skull roof—to allow its designation as a type specimen. They recognized it as belonging to a 'cotylosaurian' reptile distinct from, but related to, Milleretoides and Millerosaurus in the family Millerettidae. The clade 'Cotylosauria' is no longer used by researchers, as its original intended composition represents a paraphyletic assemblage of groups, rather than a single lineage.

In their initial description, Broom & Robinson interpreted the N. kitchingi type locality as part of the Daptocephalus Assemblage Zone. In 1954, Sidney H. Haughton and A. S. Brink published an updated summary of the fossil reptiles from the Karoo Basin. Herein, they regarded Nanomilleretta as deriving from the underlying (older) Cistecephalus Assemblage Zone.

In 1957, D. M. S. Watson published an extensive review of Millerosaurus and its other early reptilian relatives. He briefly mentioned that the skull of Nanomilleretta is "too imperfectly preserved to be identified", but considered it as clearly related to millerettids regardless. Based on Broom's initial drawings of the specimen, Watson noted that there does not appear to a anterolateral spike of the parietal bone separating part of the postfrontal from the frontal, a feature seen in 'Millerosaurus' pricei (now Milleropsis) and other millerettids, but recognized that this may simply be due to a failure to recognize this character in the specimen.

In a detailed publication on the anatomy and relationships of the Millerettidae in 1972, Chris E. Gow only mentioned Nanomilleretta in passing, claiming that the weathering of the holotype skull is so extensive that it is "devoid of diagnostic features". If no distinct anatomical features are visible in the specimen and it can not be distinguished from other millerettids, Nanomilleretta would thus be rendered a nomen dubium. Gow's work, in addition to more modern assessments and analyses of millerettids, recognized several of Broom's millerettid taxa—including Millerettoides, Milleretops, and Millerosaurus—as synonymous with Milleretta, with the features previously used to distinguish them simply due to ontogenetic variation (change through age).

A 2010 publication on tetrapods of South Africa's Beaufort Group mentioned the existence of a second BPI Nanomilleretta specimen without further detail or description.

== Description ==
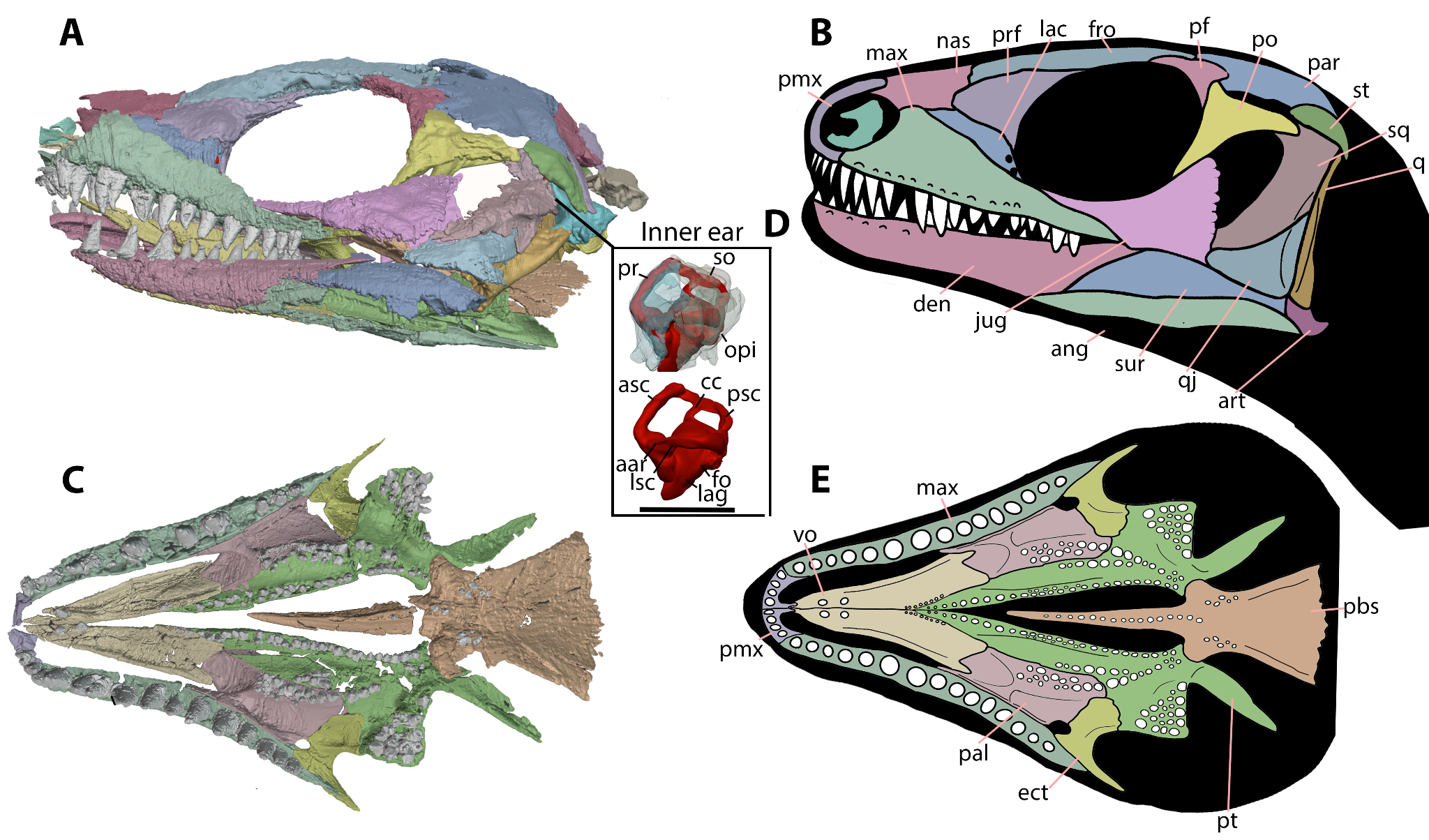
Skull of the related Milleretta

The holotype skull of Nanomilleretta is very small, with an estimated total length of 28 millimetres (1.1 in) when complete, and a greatest width of 13.5 mm (0.53 in). The orbits are proportionately large, measuring around 8.8 mm (0.35 in) long. In contrast, the snout is very short, comprising less of the skull than the orbit. The pineal foramen, a hole on the roof of the skull that houses the photoreceptive 'parietal eye', is large, as are the surrounding parietal bones. Paired postparietal and tabulars are preserved behind the parietals. Irregularly-shaped postfrontals are preserved, marking the upper rear margin of the orbit. In their 1948 description of the taxon, Broom and Robinson noted that the other rear skull bones are too weathered to identify their borders, but that they could not identify a temporal fenestra. The frontals are large and make up much of the upper orbital margin, while the prefrontals are small. The nasals (bones over the snout) and upper parts of the maxillae (upper tooth-bearing bone) are largely weathered away. Most of the premaxillae are not preserved, but they were likely small bones, based on the size of the teeth that do remain. Ten long, pointed, unserrated teeth are preserved in the maxilla, with room for a possible eleventh. The anterior (front) four are smaller than the six in the rear. This tooth morphology is consistent with insectivorous habits in Nanomilleretta and other early reptiles. Both hemimandibles are preserved in occlusion with the cranium, but are too weathered to describe in detail. The observable parts of the palatal and occipital bones are generally comparable to 'Millerettoides' (now Milleretta), though Broom and Robinson noted that Nanomilleretta could be distinguished from this taxon in the shape of the postfrontals, occipital bones, and the much larger size of the pineal foramen.

== Classification ==
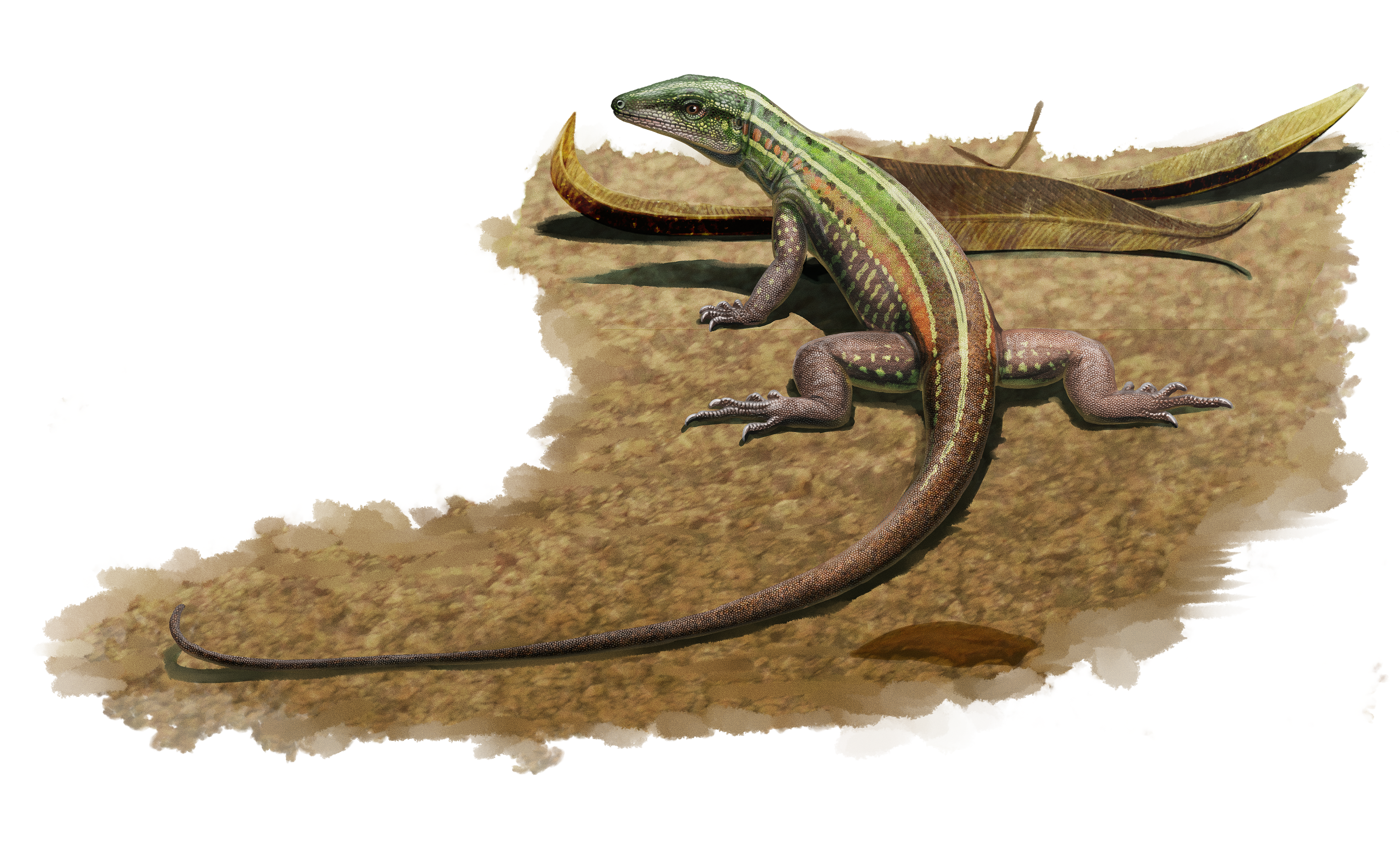
Life restoration of the millerettid Milleropsis

Nanomilleretta has consistently been recognized as a member of the family Millerettidae. Millerettids have traditionally been regarded as part of a larger early reptile radiation called the 'Parareptilia', also including mesosaurs, procolophonoids, and pareiasaurs, alongside similar taxa. However, more modern research incorporating detailed synchrotron data and expansive phylogenetic analyses have broken 'parareptiles' into a polyphyletic assemblage of early reptiles, with Millerettidae shifting into a more crownward position, as the sister group to the Neodiapsida. The placement of Millerettidae (Nanomilleretta not included) in relation to other early reptiles is displayed in the cladogram below, based on the results of Jenkins et al. (2026). Taxa traditionally regarded as 'parareptiles' are highlighted:

- Reptile total-group
  - †Araeoscelidia
  - - †Bolosauridae
    - Neoreptilia
      - †Ankyramorpha
        - †Acleistorhinidae
        - - †Pareiasauromorpha
          - †Procolophonoidea
      - - †Mesosauridae
        - - - †Orovenator
            - - †Ascendonanus
              - †Cabarzia
          - Parapleurota
            - †Millerettidae
              - †Lanthanolania
              - - †Broomia
                - - †Milleropsis
                  - †Milleretta
            - Neodiapsida
              - †Saurosternon
              - - †Younginidae
                  ⊞
                  - †Scyllacerta
                  - - †Akkedops
                    - †Youngina
                  ⊟
                - - †Tangasauridae
                    ⊞
                    - †Acerosodontosaurus
                    - - †Hovasaurus
                      - †Thadeosaurus
                    ⊟
                  - - †Weigeltisauridae
                      ⊞
                      - †Coelurosauravus elivensis
                      - †Weigeltisaurus jaekeli
                      ⊟
                    - - †Claudiosaurus
                      - Reptile crown-group
                        - Archosauromorpha
                        - Lepidosauromorpha

former 'parareptiles'
