= Heleophilus =

Heleophilus Temporal range: mid–upper Permian, ~Capitanian–Wuchiapingian

Scientific classification
- Kingdom: Animalia
- Phylum: Chordata
- Class: Reptilia
- Family: †Millerettidae (?)
- Genus: †Heleophilus; Broom, 1909
- Species: †H. acutus

Binomial name
- †Heleophilus acutus Broom, 1909

Synonyms
- Heleophiltatus (nomen superfluum) Cossmann, 1920

Extinct genus of early reptiles

Heleophilus is an extinct genus of early stem-reptile known from the Permian of South Africa. The genus contains a single species, Heleophilus acutus, known from a skull and partial skeleton described in 1909. The locality these remains were collected from likely belongs to the mid–upper Permian Endothiodon Assemblage Zone, though this is unclear and has been debated. Various authors have interpreted the remains as similar to Heleosaurus and Broomia, or as a member of the Younginidae, though the most recent summary tentatively placed it within the family Millerettidae. The skull of Heleophilus is short and tapering, bearing long, pointed teeth.

== History and identity ==
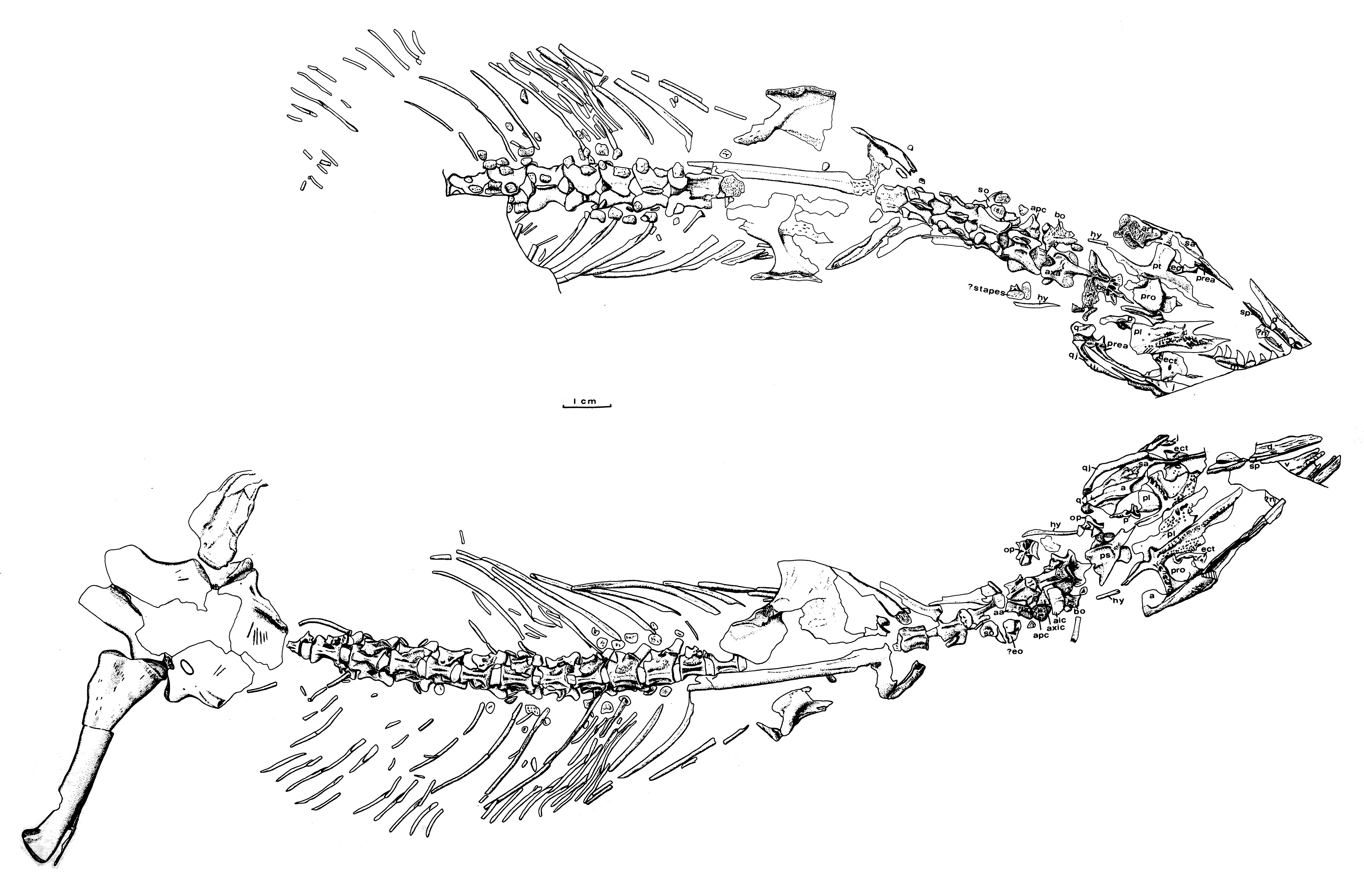
Illustrated holotype of Heleosaurus scholtzi, initially thought to be a close relative

The Heleophilus fossil material was discovered by the British-South African paleontologist and medical doctor Robert Broom in Victoria West, South Africa. The specimen consists of a small, crushed skull including the mandible, a poorly preserved portion of the neck, and part of the foot. In 1909, Broom described these fossil remains as belonging to a new genus and species, which he named Heleophilus acutus. Broom provided a brief description of the fossils without figuring them. He regarded it as "impossible to be certain" of its affinities, but considered Heleophilus to be a close relative of Heleosaurus with "typically Diaptosaurian" features, and placed both genera within the Mesosauria. (Note: The nomenclatural history of early reptiles in convoluted, and many names are now defunct or refer to different selections of taxa. Mesosauria is now generally seen as containing a single genus, the aquatic-adapted Mesosaurus. "Diaptosauria" has been regarded as a "weird conglomeration" of taxa based on modern views, and is partially synonymous with Diapsida.) Based on discussion with South African geologist A. L. du Toit, who had visited the type locality, Broom decided that the rock outcrops at Victoria West are very low in the Beaufort Group and could likely be dated to the lower to middle Permian. In a documentation that year of the vertebrate fossils in South Africa's Karoo Basin, Broom tentatively placed Heleophilus alongside Heleosaurus in the supergroup's "Pareiasaurus Beds". Both genera were maintained as relatives of Mesosaurus, but with "much less typically aquatic forms."

In 1912, German paleontologist Friedrich von Huene briefly argued that Mesosaurus was not a close relative of Heleophilus and Heleosaurus, leaving the latter genera within the broader group Cotylosauria. (Note: 'Cotylosauria' is no longer used by researchers, as its original intended composition represents a paraphyletic assemblage of groups, rather than a single lineage.) This was followed by American researcher S. W. Williston later that year, who claimed that the traditional use of the name Mesosauria "has no legitimate standing."

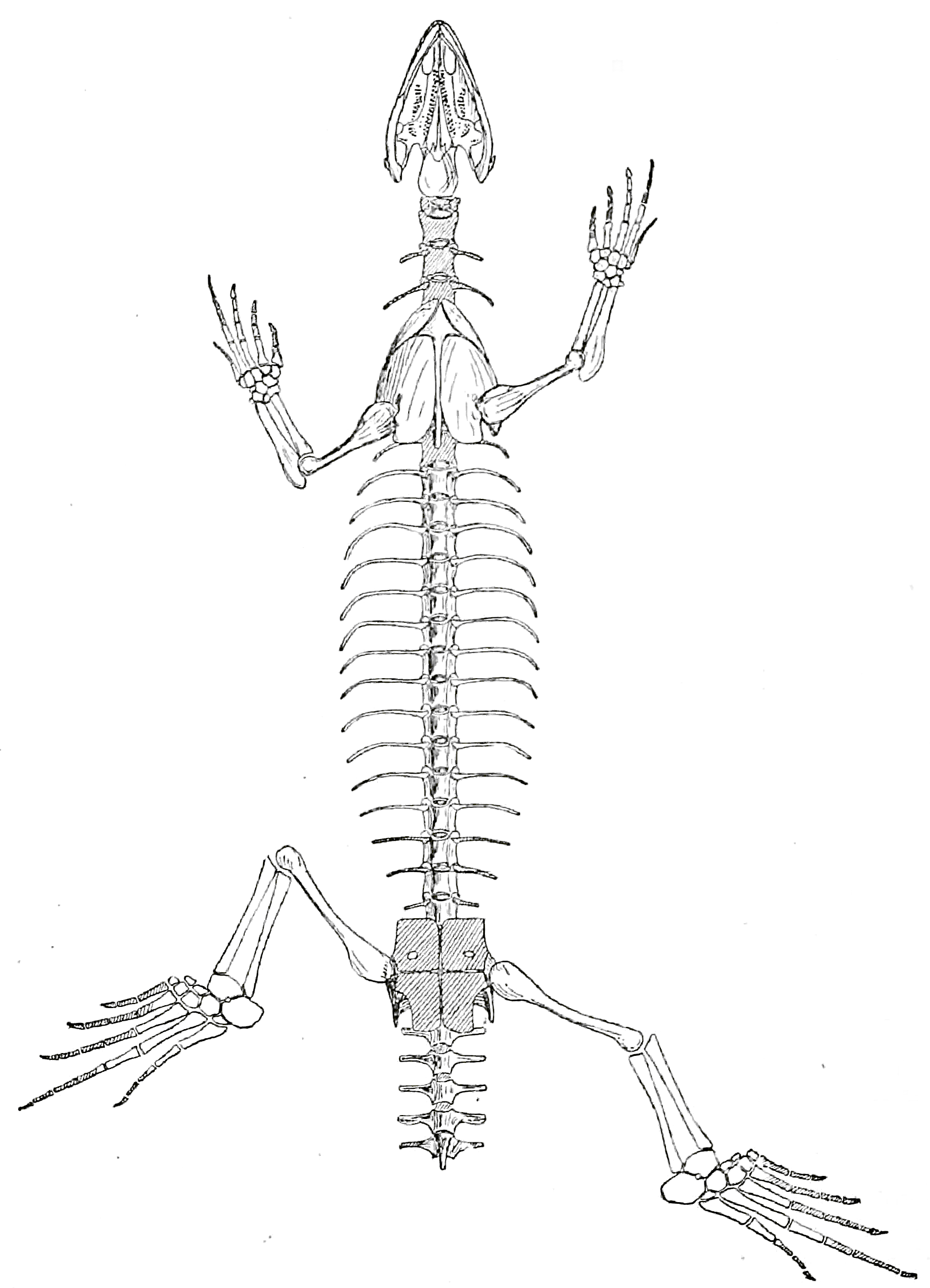
Reconstructed skeleton of Broomia, a probable close relative, by Watson (1914)

In his 1914 description of Broomia perplexa from similarly-aged South African rocks, D. M. S. Watson observed that the only taxa that could favorably be compared to this taxon were Heleophilus and Heleosaurus. He noted that some of their similarities are due to the retention of plesiomorphic (ancestral) characters, but that a close relationship between them was still plausible. Subsequent discoveries and novel interpretations of new fossils in the following years revealed that Broomia is an early member of a clade of early stem-reptiles called the Millerettidae, whose other members include Milleretta and Milleropsis.

In 1921, Broom reassessed the age of the rocks from which the H. acutus holotype was collected in Victoria West. Though he had previously claimed that they represented the "Pareiasaurus Beds/Zone" (later renamed the Tapinocephalus Zone) based on the geological surveys of du Toit, Broom noted that the much more fossiliferous strata only 20 miles (32 km) away in Biesjespoort could more confidently be correlated with the base of the younger Cistecephalus Zone. Since these rock layers are largely horizontal, he found it unlikely that the nearby rocks in Victoria West would be substantially lower. The lack of fossils between these localities makes precise dating difficult, and the site from which Heleophilus was collected has since been lost due to the construction of a dam.

In a 1922 review of Triassic 'thecodonts', von Huene hypothesized that Heleophilus—alongside Heleosaurus, Broomia, and even the more derived Protorosaurus—may form an "intermediate link" between the more "primitive cotylosaurians" and the later-diverging Archosauria ('thecodonts'). This was followed by a more exhaustive publication in 1926, in which von Huene described several fossil reptiles from South America, accompanied by a review of other obscure fossil reptiles from South Africa's Karoo Basin. Herein, he tentatively reassigned H. acutus and the Victoria West locality to the Endothiodon Zone, which is stratigraphically set between the older Tapinocephalus Zone and younger (more recent) Cistecephalus Zone. As other authors had previously stated, he emphasized a close relation of Heleophilus to Heleosaurus and Broomia. He further speculated, based on the work of Baron Franz Nopcsa, that these short-necked taxa may have affinities to a clade (Araeoscelia) including the longer-necked Araeoscelis and Kadaliosaurus. This group could then be more closely related to the Squamata (modern lizards and snakes), rather than 'thecodonts' (=archosaurs). He ultimately concluded that, due to the lack of well-preserved cranial material in key taxa, these relationships were merely speculative and based on insufficient evidence to be considered resolved. In his 1928 review of extinct and extant reptiles and their taxonomy, Nopcsa classified Heleophilus within the araeoscelian family Saurosternidae, which also included Heleosaurus, Heleosuchus, Aphelosaurus, Saurosternon, and Tangasaurus. Broomia was placed in Broomiidae, its own family within Araeoscelia.

In 1954, Sidney H. Haughton and A. S. Brink published an updated summary of the fossil reptiles from the Karoo. Herein, they placed Heleophilus, alongside Heleosaurus, Helelosuchus, Palaeagama, Paliguana, Saurosternon, and Youngina, within the family Younginidae, in turn placed in the now-dated order 'Eosuchia'. They added that the H. acutus holotype specimen is housed in the Iziko South African Museum in Cape Town, under the catalogue number 2359. The geologic horizon from which the holotype was collected was regarded as unclear. A similar classification scheme of younginids was used by Alfred S. Romer in 1956, who also considered it likely that many of the Late Permian relatives of Youngina could be considered synonymous with Saurosternon, it being the first genus named, though an inadequate understanding of their anatomy prevents this. In his 1969 volume of the Encyclopedia of Paleoherpetology, Oskar Kuhn regarded Heleophilus, Heleosaurus, and Heleosuchus as Eosuchia incertae sedis (uncertain placement). Its similarities to Heleosaurus and Broomia were reinforced, as was its tentative placement in the Endothiodon Zone. An extensive volume on the biozonation of the Karoo Supergroup in 2020 placed Victoria West near the border between the Tapinocephalus Assemblage Zone and the overlying Endothiodon Assemblage Zone, noting that the rock layers in this region become thin and unclear.

Using a preliminary phylogenetic analysis, Susan E. Evans (1988) did not find evidence for a relationship of Broomia or Heleophilus with the Diapsida. The same year, Robert L. Carroll tentatively placed Heleophilus within the family Millerettidae. Broomia was placed within this clade more confidently, while Heleosaurus was regarded as a 'thecodont' of uncertain affinities. Later research determined that Heleosaurus could be placed within the family Varanopidae, a group traditionally placed within Synapsida (animals more closely related to mammals than to reptiles). However, the placement of this clade remains unsettled, and some analyses recover varanopids within the reptile total group (closer to reptiles than mammals).

The cladogram below shows abbreviated results of the phylogenetic analysis of Xavier A. Jenkins and colleagues (2025), which includes novel observations derived from synchrotron μCT scans of several of the included specimens. Heleophilus was not incorporated, but the positions of Heleosaurus within Varanopidae and Broomia within Millerettidae are highlighted. Also note the placements of Araeoscelidia and Younginidae, both of which Heleophilus has historically thought to be associated with.

- Amniota
  - Synapsida
    - †Caseasauria
    - - †Varanopidae
        - †Archaeovenator
        - - †Apsisaurus
          - - †Varanodontinae
              ⊞
              - †Aerosaurus
              - - †Varanops
                - - †Varanodon
                  - †Watongia
              ⊟
            - †Mycterosaurinae
              - †Mycterosaurus
              - - †Elliotsmithia
                - - †Heleosaurus
                  - †Mesenosaurus
      - - Metopophora
  - Reptile total-group
    - †Araeoscelidia
    - - †Bolosauridae
      - Neoreptilia
        - †Ankyramorpha
        - - †Mesosauridae
          - - †Orovenator clade
            - Parapleurota
              - †Millerettidae
                - †Lanthanolania
                - - †Broomia
                  - - †Milleropsis
                    - - †Milleretta
                      - †Millerosaurus
              - Neodiapsida
                - †Younginidae
                  ⊞
                  - †Scyllacerta
                  - †Youngina
                  ⊟
                - - †Tangasauridae
                  - - †Weigeltisauridae
                    - - †Claudiosaurus
                      - Reptile crown-group
                        - Archosauromorpha
                        - Lepidosauromorpha

== Description ==
As an early-diverging stem-reptile, Heleophilus would have been a superficially lizard-like animal with slender limbs. The morphology of the skull is relatively short, tapering to a sharp point toward the front, similar to the condition in Broomia and Heleosaurus. The Heleophilus acutus holotype skull is 2.8 centimetres (1.1 in) long and around 1.4 centimetres (0.55 in) wide. It includes parts of the premaxillae and maxillae (upper tooth-bearing bones) and fragments of the palate. The hemimandibles are fairly well preserved. The premaxilla bears about three teeth, with around 15 in the maxilla. The teeth are long, pointed, and round in cross-section, with no evidence of serrations. In comparison, the teeth of Heleosaurus are recurved, with serrations along the forward- and backward-facing edges.

A few fragments of poorly preserved cervical (neck) vertebrae are known in Heleophilus, suggesting the neck was likely slightly shorter than the skull. The foot includes four metatarsals, with the fifth visible as a faint impression. Digit IV includes five slender phalanges. No phalanges are preserved for the other digits. At least four well-developed tarsals are visible. Watson (1914) reported that, like Broomia and Heleosaurus, Heleophilus has intercentra throughout its vertebral series, robustly-built vertebral neural arches, and single-headed ribs.
