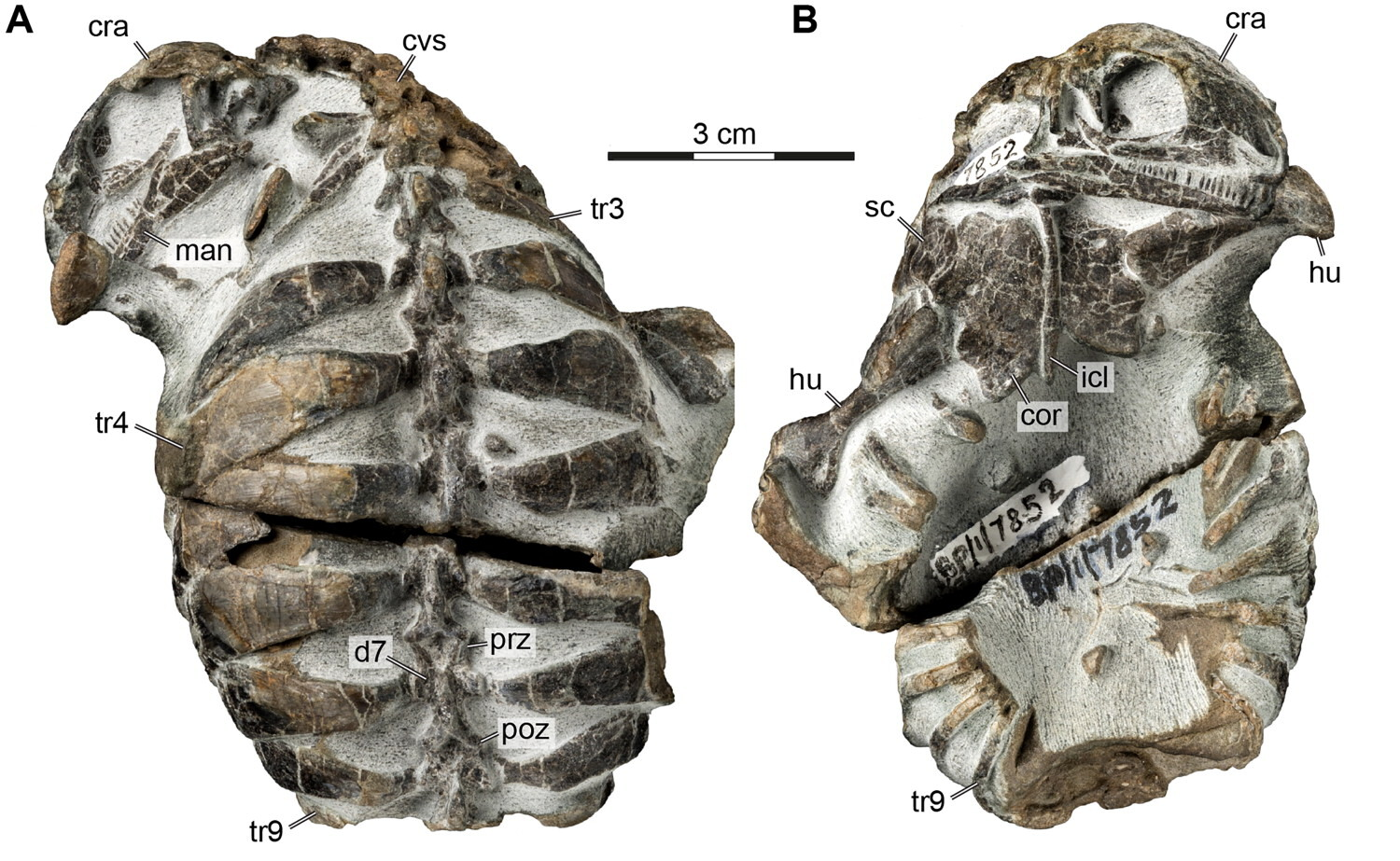
- BP/1/7852, a specimen of E. africanus discovered in 2016

Scientific classification
- Kingdom: Animalia
- Phylum: Chordata
- Class: Reptilia
- Clade: Neoreptilia
- Clade: Parapleurota
- Family: †Millerettidae (?)
- Genus: †Eunotosaurus; Seeley, 1892
- Species: †E. africanus

Binomial name
- †Eunotosaurus africanus Seeley, 1892

= Eunotosaurus =

Eunotosaurus Temporal range: Middle Permian, 265.8–259 Ma

Extinct genus of reptiles

Eunotosaurus (Latin: stout-backed lizard) is an extinct genus of sauropsid (reptile, in the broad sense) of disputed affinities. It is known from the late Middle Permian (Capitanian stage) of the Karoo Supergroup of South Africa and the Mwesia Beds of Malawi. Its ribs are wide and flat, forming broad plates similar to a primitive turtle shell, and the vertebrae are comparable to those of some turtles. Accordingly, Eunotosaurus has often been considered a possible transitional fossil between turtles and their prehistoric ancestors. However, it is possible that these turtle-like features evolved independently of the same features in turtles, since other anatomical studies and phylogenetic analyses suggest Eunotosaurus may instead have been a 'parareptile', an early-diverging neodiapsid unrelated to turtles, or a synapsid. Several studies have argued for a placement as a millerettid stem-reptile only distantly related to turtles.

== History of study ==
Eunotosaurus was named in 1892 based on a specimen (now NHMUK PV R 1968 in the Natural History Museum, London) that Harry Seeley had obtained from Mr. L. Pienaar at the farm Weltevreden near Beaufort West, during his visit to South Africa in 1889. Seeley was uncertain of the systematic position of Eunotosaurus, but postulated that it was likely referable to the Mesosauria, based on the pubis anatomy. It was not until 1914 that it was proposed to be an ancestor of Chelonia, the turtle order. English zoologist D. M. S. Watson claimed that Eunotosaurus was transitional between cotylosaurs (now referred to as captorhinids) and Chelonia. He compared it to "Archichelone", a name he devised for a hypothetical chelonian ancestor, noting that its ribs appeared to be intermediate between those of turtles and other tetrapods. Watson's "Archichelone" had a pelvic girdle that was pushed back on the vertebral column and placed under the shell. However, fossils of Eunotosaurus show that the pelvis is in the normal tetrapod position and is placed over the ribs rather than within them, as in modern turtles. Many fossils have been found showing a semi-rigid, turtle-like rib cage, one which presumably necessitated a tortoise-like fashion of walking.

Eunotosaurus was considered the ancestor of turtles until the late 1940s. In his 1956 book Osteology of the Reptiles, American paleontologist Alfred Sherwood Romer claimed that Eunotosaurus could not be included within Chelonia based on the available evidence. He placed it within Anapsida in its own order incertae sedis.

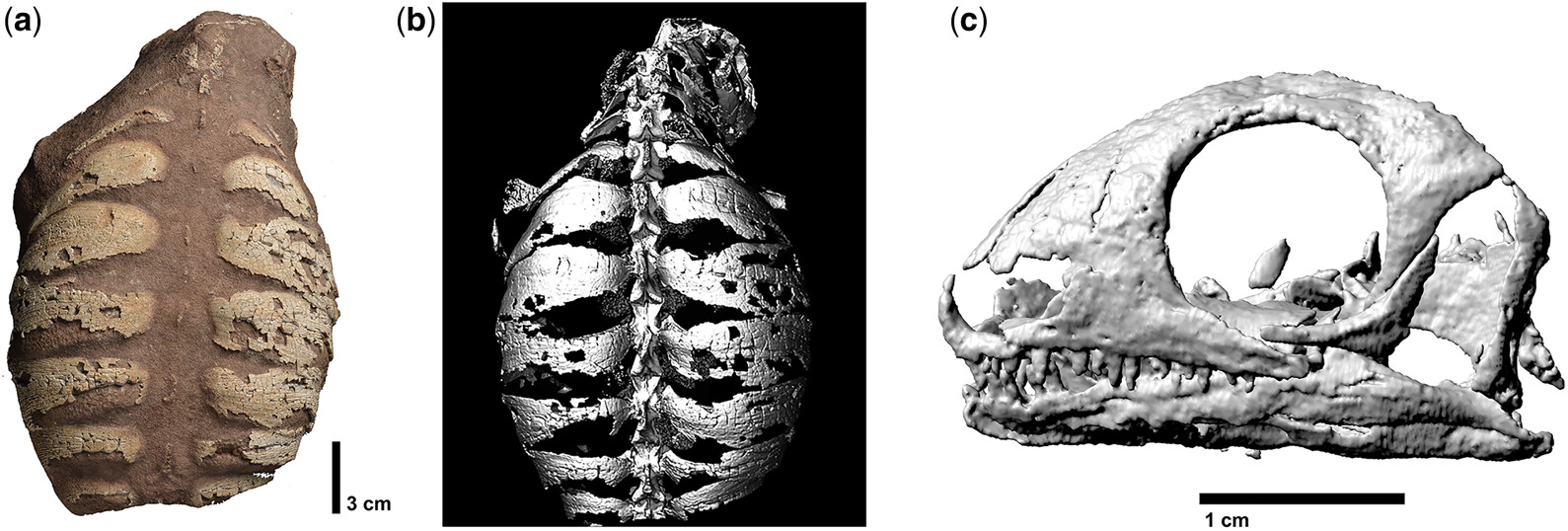
Specimen from the Mwesia Beds (Malawi) with a close-up of the skull based on CT data

Over a century after its naming, Eunotosaurus was known from fewer than a dozen specimens, with very little material known from the skull. Despite the paucity of material, it was well described. Two additional skeletons were unearthed from the Karoo Supergroup and described in 1999. They are now housed in the Bernard Price Institute for Palaeontological Research in Johannesburg and the National Museum, Bloemfontein. While relatively rare, Eunotosaurus is common enough in the Karoo to be used as a biostratigraphic marker. It is present in the upper Tapinocephalus Assemblage Zone and in all parts of the succeeding Lycosuchus - Eunotosaurus Subzone of the Endothiodon Assemblage Zone. In 2024, an articulated Eunotosaurus fossil was described from the collections of the Cultural & Museum Centre Karonga in Malawi, having been discovered in 2016 by a herdsman in the Mwesia Beds of Karonga. This marked the first occurrence of Eunotosaurus outside South Africa, and confirmed that the Mwesia Beds correspond to the Tapinocephalus and Pristerognathus zones.

== Description ==
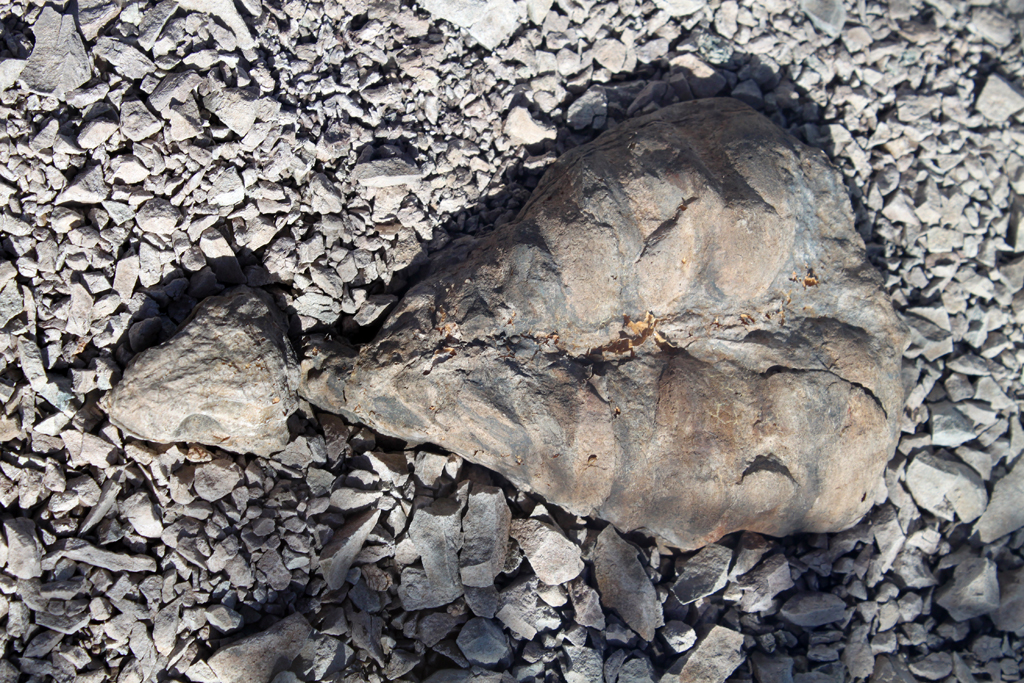
Fossil specimen on display at Karoo National Park

Skull of Eunotosaurus in various views. Key: art, articular; an, angular; bo, basioccipital; c, coronoid; d, dentary; ect, ectopterygoid; ep, epipterygoid; f, frontal; hy, hyoid; j, jugal; l, lacrimal; m, maxilla; n, nasal; op, opisthotic; p, parietal; pal, palatine; pbs, parabasisphenoid; pm, premaxilla; po, postorbital; pof, postfrontal; pp, postparietal; pra, prearticular; prf, prefrontal; pr, prootic; pt, pterygoid; q, quadrate; qj, quadratojugal; sa, surangular; scl, scleral ossicles; so, supraoccipital; sp, splenial; sq, squamosal; st, supratemporal; stp, stapes; tab, tabular; v, vomer. Scale bar=1 cm.

Eunotosaurus reached up to 30 cm (12 in) in total body length. It has a broad body formed by nine pairs of widened ribs that overlap each other. The forward-most ribs are angled slightly backward, and the backward-most ribs angle slightly forward. The ribs are T-shaped in cross-section, each having a broad, flat surface on the top and a narrow ridge running along its length on the bottom. The upper surface is convex, giving the body of Eunotosaurus a rounded shape. Each pair of ribs connects to an elongated dorsal or back vertebra. Most ribs are fused to the vertebrae, but some smaller specimens of Eunotosaurus have rib pairs that articulate with the vertebrae but are not fused to them. There are nine dorsal vertebrae, far fewer than what is seen in other parareptiles. The neck of Eunotosaurus is short, consisting of six cervical vertebrae.

Histological analysis of cross-sections of the ribs indicates that they grew in three different phases as an individual developed. As is the case in most land vertebrates, the first phase involves the growth of a rib primordium that ossifies into a rib bone. The second phase, which deviates from most other land vertebrates, is the development of a shelf of bone above the main shaft of the rib to form the T-shape. The third and final phase is the widening of the lower ridge into a teardrop-like shape, reinforcing the rib. While the third phase is unique to Eunotosaurus and the millerettid Milleretta rubidgei, the second phase is also seen in modern turtles. In turtles, the shelf of bone that forms from the rib shaft becomes a plate of the shell or carapace. In each rib of Eunotosaurus, the posterior surface of the lower ridge has Sharpey's fibers embedded in it. Sharpey's fibers help anchor muscles to bone. Most amniotes have Sharpey's fibers on the posterior and anterior edges of the ribs because the ribs are connected to each other by intercostal muscles, which are muscles that assist in breathing. The lack of Sharpey's fibers on the anterior side of the ribs of Eunotosaurus suggests that it lacked functional intercostal muscles. Turtles also lack intercostal muscles and instead have muscles that connect to the undersides of the ribs for the purpose of locomotion. If Eunotosaurus is close to the ancestry of turtles, it may have had similar sets of muscles.

Even though Eunotosaurus has been traditionally considered an anapsid, it is considered to possess a lower temporal fenestra, though without the temporal bar. Moreover, a juvenile specimen also shows upper temporal fenestrae, meaning the skull demonstrates a fully diapsid condition, a feature that is now recognized in other millerettids. In the adult, the upper fenestra is covered by a ventrolateral flange of the parietal.

== Classification ==
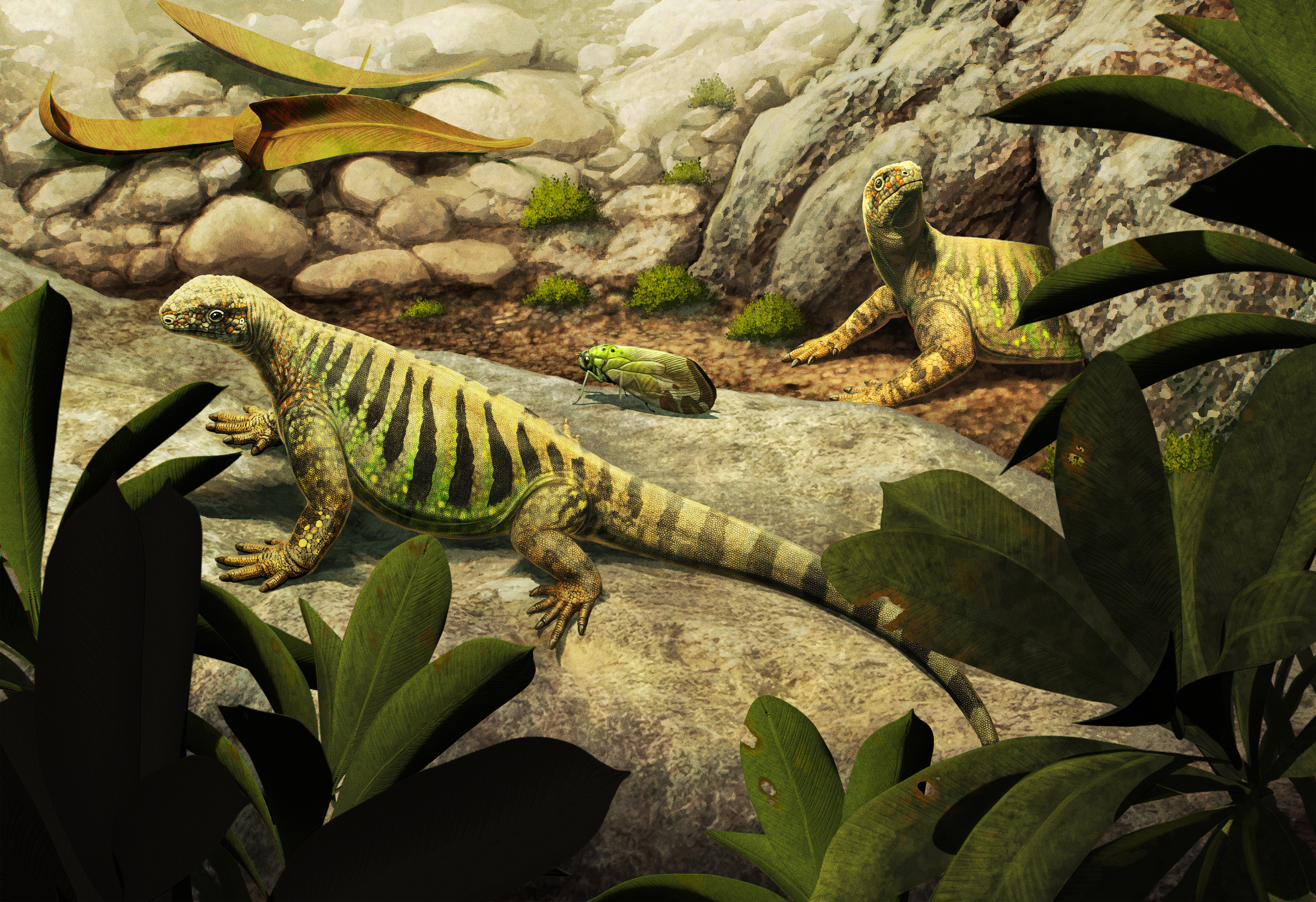
Life restoration by Gabriel Ugueto

The ribs of Eunotosaurus are very wide and flat, touching each other to form broad plates similar to the carapace of turtles. Moreover, the number of vertebrae, the size of the vertebrae, and superficial aspects of their structure are were considered identical to those of some turtles as well as millerettids. Despite its many similarities to turtles, Eunotosaurus has a skull that shares many characteristics with the skulls of more ancestral reptiles, resulting in many studies placing it in the extinct group Parareptilia, a group that is now recognized as a polyphyletic assemblage of stem reptiles. Until recently, phylogenetic analyses that use only the physical features of fossils and living species to determine evolutionary relationships of reptiles have often shown strong support for both Eunotosaurus and turtles being descendants of "parareptiles". However, analyses which also include genetic data from living reptiles strongly support the idea that turtles fall within a group called Diapsida, as close relatives of either lizards (in which case they would be lepidosauromorphs) or birds and crocodiles (making them archosauromorphs). According to this view, the expanded ribs and similar vertebral columns of Eunotosaurus, millerettids, and turtles may be a case of evolutionary convergence. However, the discovery of Pappochelys, a prehistoric species whose fossil remains show a mixture of features found in Eunotosaurus and the toothed stem-turtle Odontochelys, was suggested to resolve the issue. Though an analysis which included data from Pappochelys found weak support for the idea that Eunotosaurus was a parareptile, it found stronger support for the hypothesis that Eunotosaurus was itself a diapsid closely related to turtles, and that its apparently primitive skull was probably developed as part of the turtle lineage, independently of parareptiles, although this is no longer supported.

Eunotosaurus was assigned to its own family, Eunotosauridae, in 1954. In 1969, it was placed in the parareptile suborder Captorhinomorpha. In 1997, Gow recognized Eunotosaurus as a millerettid stem reptile based on widespread similarities in the structure of the dorsal ribs, tympanic fossa, and stapes. In 2000, Eunotosaurus was placed in the clade Parareptilia, separate from turtles and cotylosaurs. A 2008 phylogenetic analysis of parareptiles found Eunotosaurus to be the sister taxon of Milleretta and thus within the family Millerettidae.

Eunotosaurus was incorporated in a 2010 phylogenetic analysis that sought to determine the origin of turtles. Turtles had been recognized as diapsids on the basis of genetic and phylogenetic evidence, and thus more closely related to modern lizards, snakes, crocodiles, and birds than parareptiles. However, with the inclusion of Eunotosaurus and the Late Triassic stem turtle Proganochelys, the resulting phylogenetic tree placed turtles outside Diapsida in a position similar to turtles' original placement as parareptiles. This study claimed that Eunotosaurus shared derived features of its ribs and vertebrae with the earliest turtles, thus making it a transitional form. The study identified several features that united Eunotosaurus with turtles in a true clade. These include broad T-shaped ribs, ten elongated trunk vertebrae (although Eunotosaurus possesses nine trunk vertebrae, one fewer than all known turtles), cranial tubercles (small projections on the surface of the skull, also shared with millerettids), and a wide trunk. The clade consisting of Eunotosaurus and turtles was called Pantestudines (defined as all animals more closely related to turtles than to any other living group). More derived pantestudines, such as Odontochelys, have a plastron.

The following cladogram from Ruta et al., 2011 shows the phylogenetic position of the Eunotosaurus as a parareptile unrelated to turtles.

- †Parareptilia
  - †Mesosauria
  - - †Eunotosaurus africanus
    - †Millerettidae
      - †Milleretta rubidgei
      - - †Broomia perplexa
        - - †"Millerosaurus" nuffieldi
          - - †Milleropsis pricei
            - †Millerosaurus ornatus
    - †Procolophonomorpha
      - †Australothyris smithi
      - †Microleter mckinzieorum
      - †Ankyramorpha

The cladogram below follows the most likely result found by another analysis of turtle relationships, published by Rainer Schoch and Hans-Dieter Sues in 2015. This study found Eunotosaurus to be an actual early stem-turtle, though other versions of the analysis found weak support for it as a parareptile.

- Archelosauria
  - Archosauromorpha
  - Lepidosauromorpha
    - - †Kuehneosauridae
      - Lepidosauria
        - Squamata
        - Rhynchocephalia
    - Pantestudines
      - †Sauropterygia
        - †Eosauropterygia
        - - †Sinosaurosphargis
          - †Placodontia
      - - †Eunotosaurus
        - - †Pappochelys
          - - †Odontochelys
            - Testudinata
              - †Proganochelys
              - Testudines

A 2021 publication suggested that Eunotosaurus is not even a member of the reptile lineage, but instead a synapsid in the clade Caseasauria, based on the researchers' reinterpretations of its anatomy and apparent similarities to these taxa, although this was based on the only known skull of Eunotosaurus at the time, which was distorted during fossilization and poorly prepared.

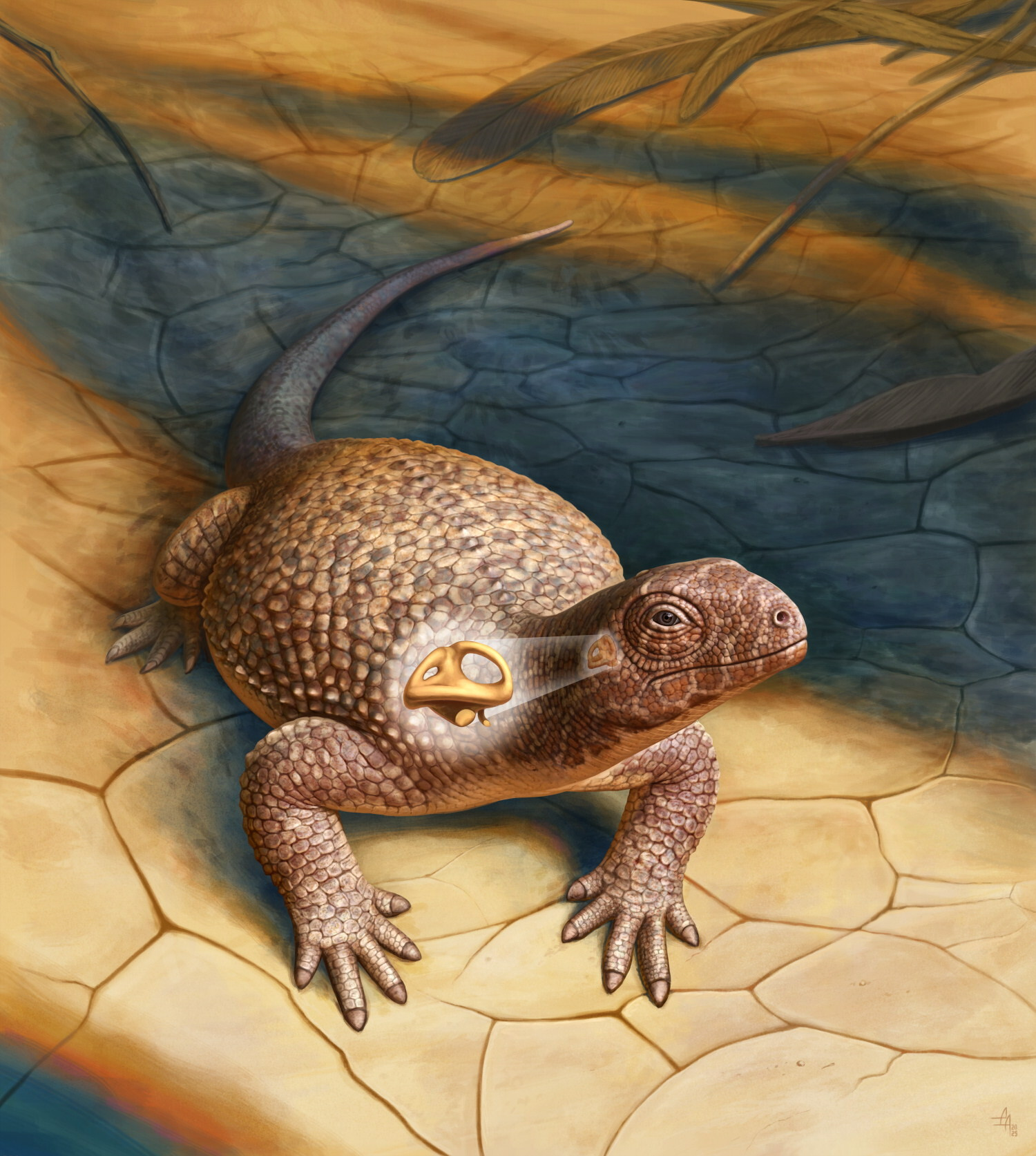
Life restoration by Andrey Atuchin, highlighting the semicircular canals of the inner ear

The following cladogram is adapted from a 2022 study by Simões et al. Here, Eunotosaurus was recovered as neither a parareptile nor a stem-turtle, but as a basal neodiapsid located outside the reptilian crown group.

- Sauropsida
  - †Acleistorhinidae
  - - †Millerettidae
    - - †Mesosaurus
      - Neoreptilia
        - †Procolophonia
        - Neodiapsida
          - †Younginiformes
          - - †Eunotosaurus
            - - †Coelurosauravus
              - Sauria
                - Lepidosauromorpha
                - Archelosauria
                  - Archosauromorpha
                  - Testudines
                    - †Pappochelys
                    - - †Odontochelys
                      - - †Kayentachelys
                        - †Proganochelys

In 2026, Evers and colleagues described the inner ear and semicircular canal anatomy of BP/1/7852, a Eunotosaurus specimen discovered ten years prior. Using high-resolution CT scans of the specimen, they identified features of the labyrinth in Eunotosaurus that are seen in both turtle-line reptiles and more ancestral neodiapsids outside of the reptile crown group. Later that year, Jenkins and colleagues revised the anatomy of all known specimens of Eunotosaurus and found to be millerettid stem reptile which, alongside Milleretta, shares many anatomical features convergent with early pantestudines. Cladogram after Jenkins et al., 2026:

- Sauropsida
  - †Araeoscelidia
  - - †Bolosauridae
    - - †Ankyramorpha
        ⊞
        - †Acleistorhinidae
        - †Procolophonia
          - †Pareiasauromorpha
          - †Procolophonoidea
        ⊟
      - - †Mesosauria
        - - - †Ascendonanus
            - †Orovenator
            - †Cabarzia
          - Parapleurota
            - †Millerettidae
              - †Lanthanolania
              - - †Milleropsis
                - - †Broomia
                  - - †Milleretta
                    - †Eunotosaurus
            - Neodiapsida
              - †Saurosternon
              - - †Younginidae
                - - †Tangasauridae
                  - - †Claudiosaurus
                    - - †Weigeltisauridae
                      - †Drepanosauromorpha
                      - Sauria/Reptilia
                        - Lepidosauromorpha
                        - Archosauromorpha
                          - †Sauropterygia
                          - - †Protorosaurus
                            - Archelosauria
                              - Pantestudines
                              - - †Tanystropheidae
                                - - †Prolacerta
                                  - - †Allokotosauria
                                    - - †Rhynchosauria
                                      - - †Teyujagua
                                        - Archosauriformes (including Archosauria)
