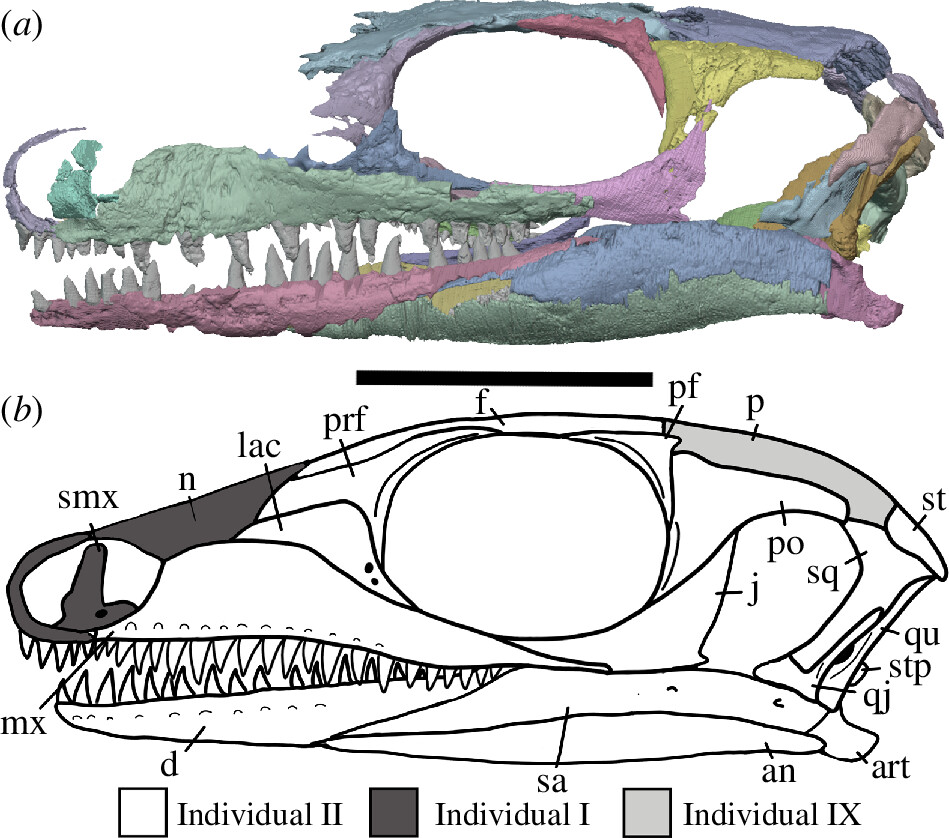
- Reconstructed skull of Milleropsis
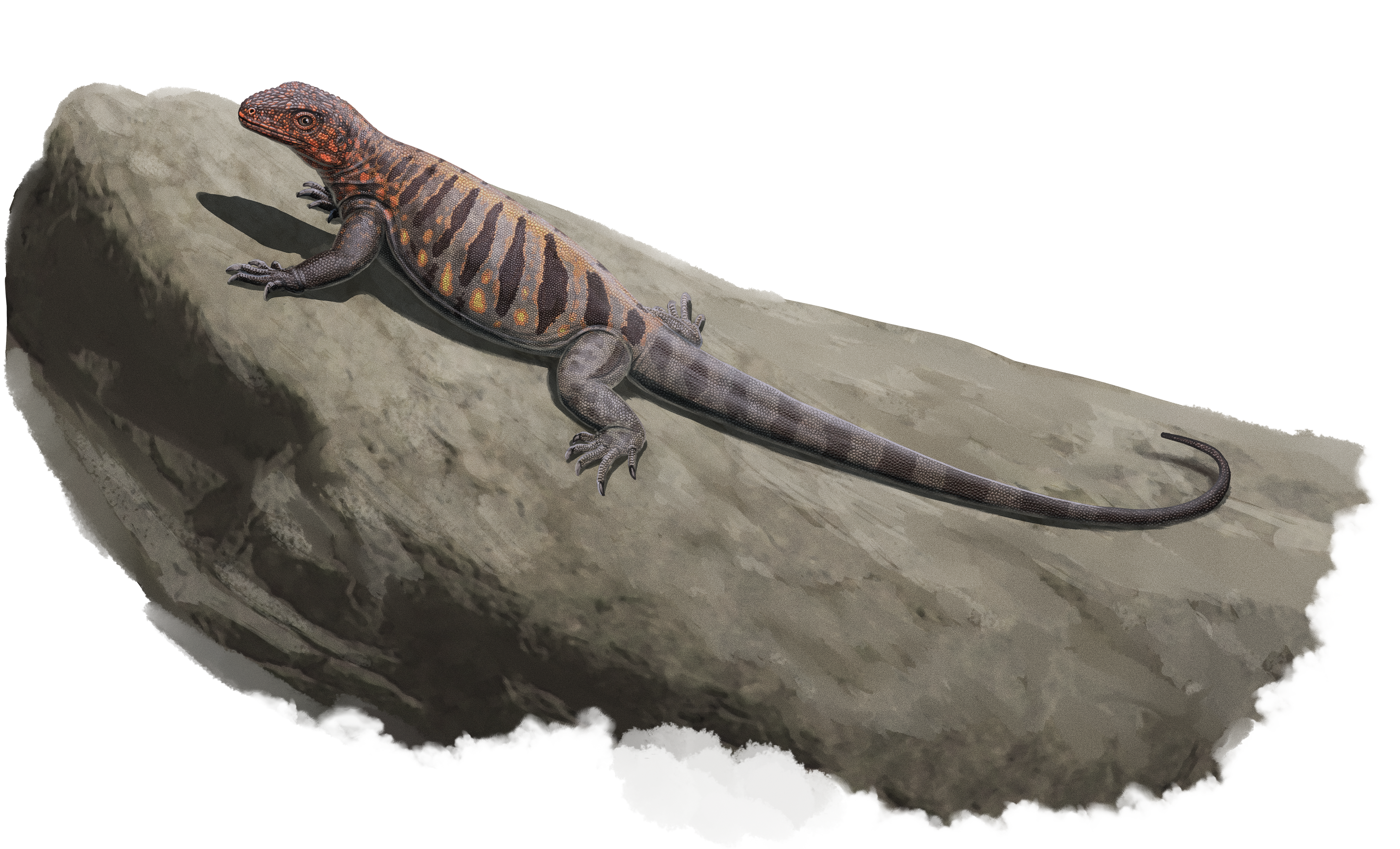
- Speculative life restoration of Milleretta

Scientific classification
- Kingdom: Animalia
- Phylum: Chordata
- Class: Reptilia
- Clade: Parapleurota
- Family: †Millerettidae; Watson, 1957

Genera
- †Broomia; †Eunotosaurus?; †Heleophilus？; †Lanthanolania?; †Milleretta; †Milleropsis; †Millerosaurus; †Nanomilleretta

= Millerettidae =

Millerettidae Temporal range: Middle-Late Permian, Capitanian–Changhsingian

Extinct family of reptiles

Millerettidae is an extinct family of early stem-reptiles from the Middle Permian to the Late Permian period (Capitanian - Changhsingian stages) of South Africa and possibly Russia. Although they were interpreted as a group of 'parareptiles', recent anatomical studies and phylogenetic analyses have suggested that they are better interpreted as close relatives of the Neodiapsida as part of the larger clade Parapleurota. The millerettids were small insectivores and probably resembled modern lizards in appearance and lifestyle, even possessing a tympanum, or eardrum, on the side of their skull.

The following cladogram shows the phylogenetic position of the Millerettidae within 'Parareptilia', from Ruta et al., 2011.

- †Parareptilia
  - Mesosauria
    - Brazilosaurus sanpauloensis
    - Mesosaurus tenuidens
    - Stereosternum tumidum
  - - Eunotosaurus africanus
    - Millerettidae
      - Milleretta rubidgei
      - - Broomia perplexa
        - - "Millerosaurus" nuffieldi
          - - Milleropsis pricei
            - Millerosaurus ornatus
    - Procolophonomorpha
      - Australothyris smithi
      - Microleter mckinzieorum
      - Ankyramorpha

Subsequent research by Jenkins and colleagues in 2025 and 2026, based on synchrotron data and an expansive phylogenetic dataset, recovered the Millerettidae as the sister group to the Neodiapsida, closer to the reptile crown group. Buffa et al. (2025) also found support for a crownward placement of Millerettidae based largely on postcranial data not considered by previous studies. Jenkins et al. (2026) reassessed the controversial Eunotosaurus, finding it to be a derived millerettid close to Milleretta These results are displayed in the cladogram below, with taxa traditionally regarded as 'parareptiles' highlighted:

- Sauropsida
  - †Araeoscelidia
  - - †Bolosauridae
    - - †Erpetonyx
      - Neoreptilia
        - †Ankyramorpha
          - †Acleistorhinidae
          - - †Pareiasauromorpha
            - †Procolophonoidea
        - - †Mesosauridae
          - - - †Ascendonanus
              - †Cabarzia
              - †Orovenator
            - - †Millerettidae
                - †Lanthanolania
                - - †Milleropsis
                  - - †Broomia
                    - - †Eunotosaurus
                      - †Milleretta
              - Neodiapsida
                - †Saurosternon
                - - †Younginidae
                    ⊞
                    - †Scyllacerta
                    - - †Akkedops
                      - †Youngina
                    ⊟
                  - - †Tangasauridae
                      ⊞
                      - †Acerosodontosaurus
                      - - †Hovasaurus
                        - †Thadeosaurus
                      ⊟
                    - - †Claudiosaurus
                      - - †Weigeltisauridae
                        - †Drepanosauromorpha
                        - - Reptile crown group
                            (Lepidosauromorpha +
                            Archosauromorpha)

former 'parareptiles'
