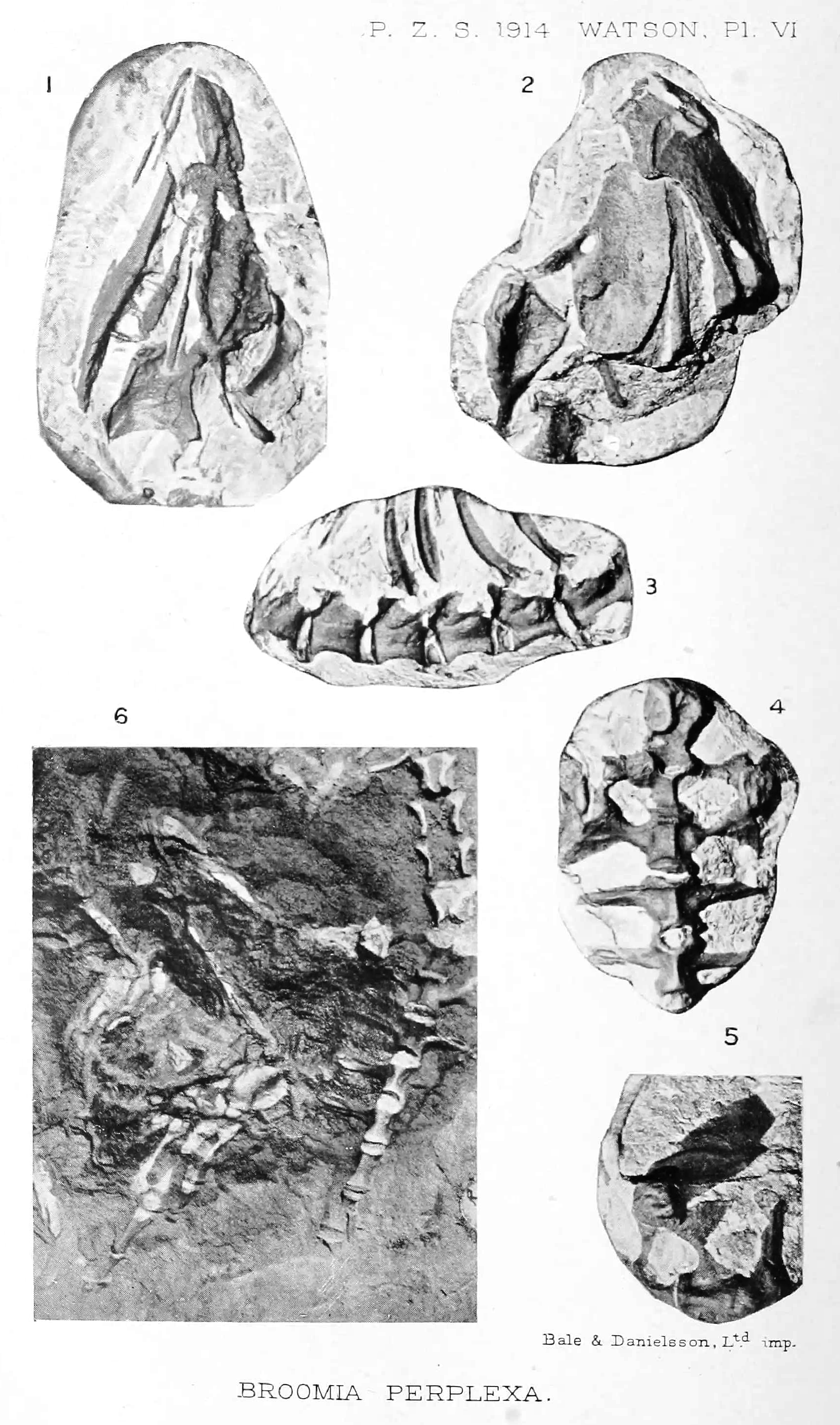
- Details of the holotype (BMNH R4065)

Scientific classification
- Kingdom: Animalia
- Phylum: Chordata
- Class: Reptilia
- Family: †Millerettidae
- Genus: †Broomia; Watson, 1914

Type species
- †Broomia perplexa Watson, 1914

= Broomia =

Broomia Temporal range: Middle Permian, Capitanian

Extinct genus of reptiles

Broomia is an extinct genus of millerettid stem-reptiles from the Middle Permian (Capitanian stage) of South Africa. It was described in 1914 by D. M. S. Watson. A second specimen of Broomia was described in 2008 by Juan C. Cisneros and colleagues, which belongs to a subadult individual smaller than the holotype.

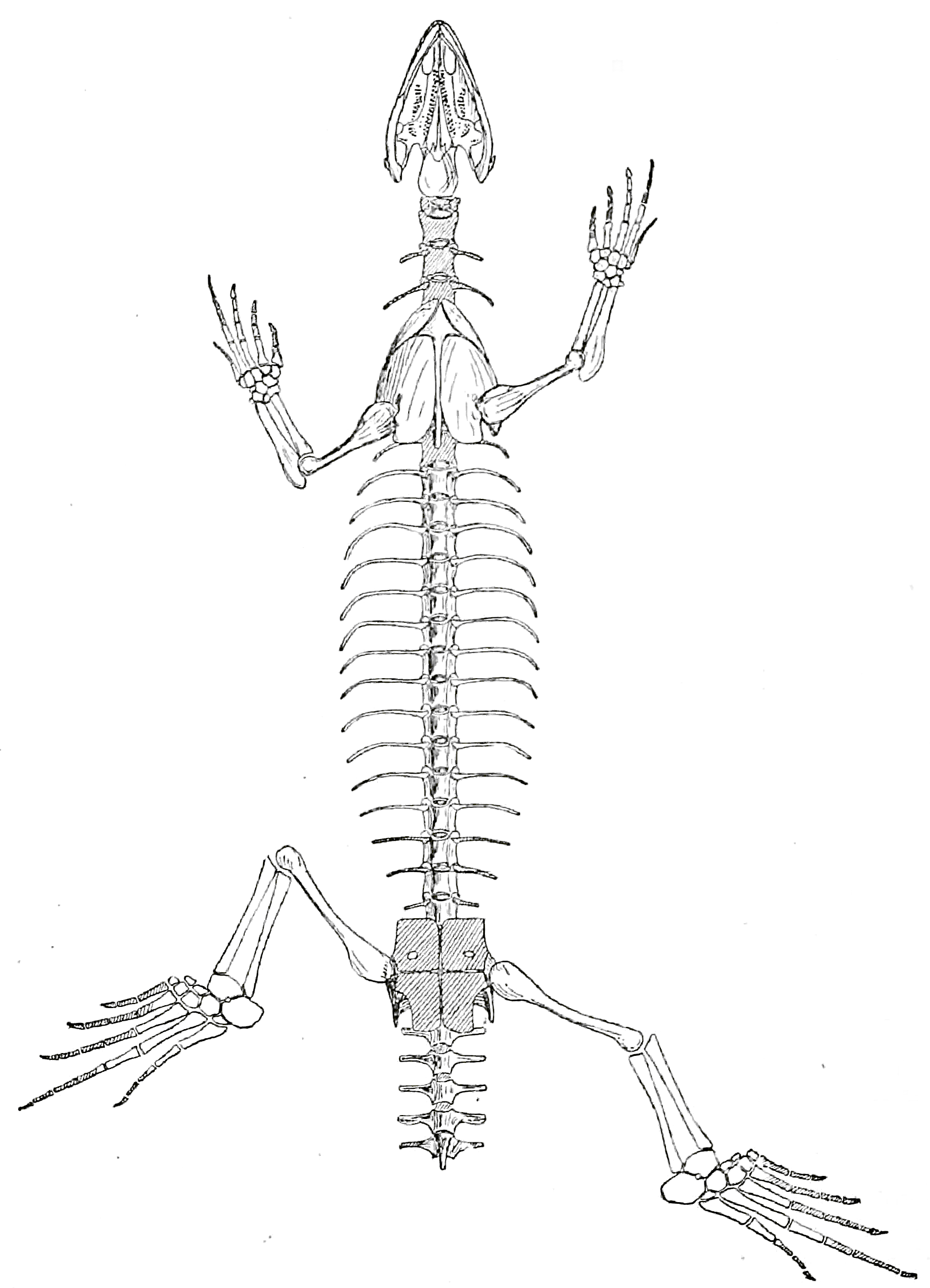
Reconstructed skeleton of B. perplexa seen from below, based on the holotype

Research by Jenkins and colleagues (2025) based on synchrotron data and an expansive phylogenetic dataset recovered the Millerettidae as the sister group to the Neodiapsida, close to the reptile crown group. Broomia was recovered as the sister taxon to the clade formed by Milleropsis, Milleretta, and Millerosaurus. These results are displayed in the cladogram below, with taxa traditionally regarded as 'parareptiles' highlighted:

- Sauropsida
  - †Araeoscelidia
  - - †Bolosauridae
    - Neoreptilia
      - †Ankyramorpha
        - †Acleistorhinidae
        - - †Pareiasauromorpha
          - †Procolophonoidea
      - - †Mesosauridae
        - - - †Cabarzia
            - - †Ascendonanus
              - †Orovenator
          - Parapleurota
            - Neodiapsida
            - †Millerettidae
              - †Lanthanolania
              - - †Broomia
                - - †Milleropsis
                  - - †Milleretta
                    - †Millerosaurus

former 'parareptiles'
