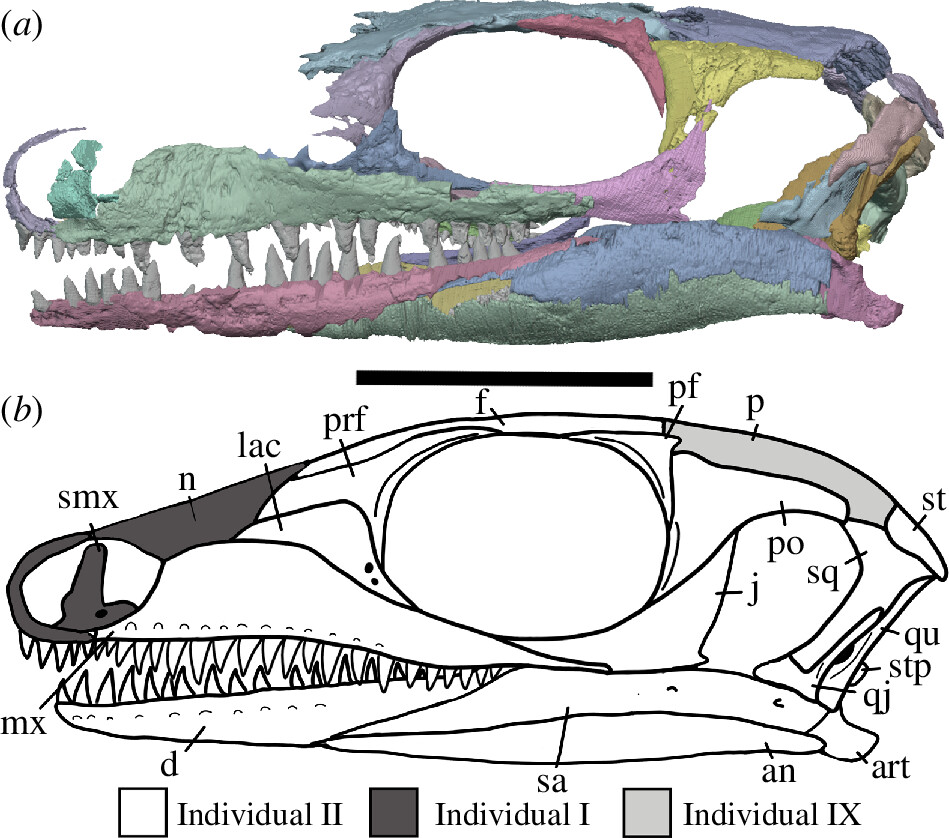
- Reconstructed skull of Milleropsis based on micro-CT scans
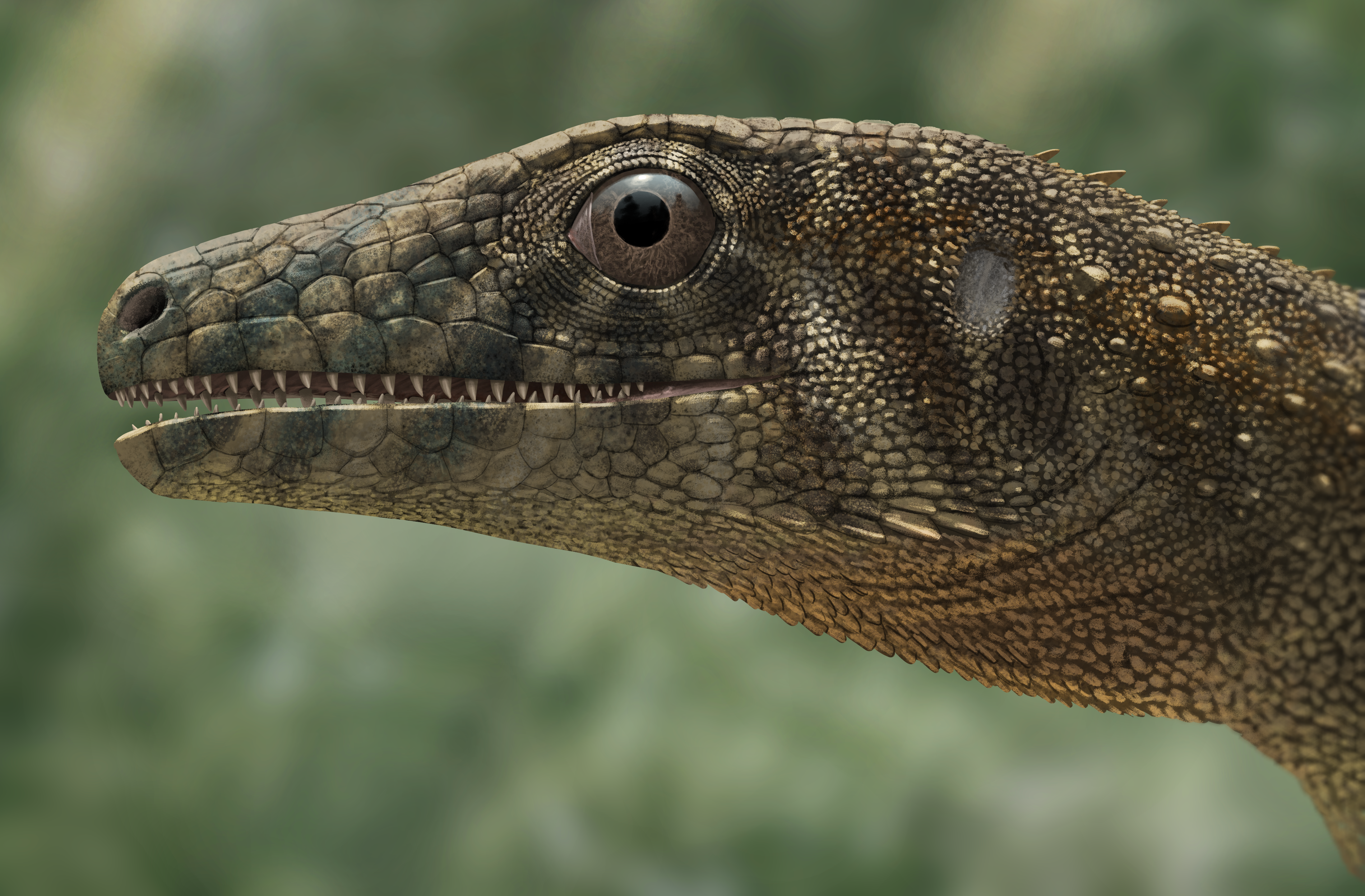
- Life restoration

Scientific classification
- Kingdom: Animalia
- Phylum: Chordata
- Class: Reptilia
- Family: †Millerettidae
- Genus: †Milleropsis; Gow, 1972

Type species
- †Milleropsis pricei (Watson, 1957 [originally Millerosaurus pricei])

Synonyms
- Millerinoides Broom, 1941; Millerinoides acutirostris Broom, 1941

= Milleropsis =

Milleropsis Temporal range: Late Permian, Changhsingian

Extinct genus of reptiles

Milleropsis is an extinct genus of millerettid reptile from the Late Permian (Changhsingian stage) of South Africa. The holotype specimen of Milleropsis (BP-1-720) is a preserved burrow aggregation of at least nine semi-articulated individuals. Recent work using high-resolution CT imaging has demonstrated that Milleropsis shares a variety of anatomical features with neodiapsid stem reptiles, casting doubt on the validity of Parareptilia, the clade to which millerettids have often been assigned.

Research by Jenkins and colleagues (2025) based on synchrotron data and an expansive phylogenetic dataset recovered the Millerettidae as the sister group to the Neodiapsida, close to the reptile crown group. Milleropsis was recovered as the sister taxon to the clade formed by Milleretta and Millerosaurus. These results are displayed in the cladogram below, with taxa traditionally regarded as 'parareptiles' highlighted:

- Sauropsida
  - †Araeoscelidia
  - - †Bolosauridae
    - Neoreptilia
      - †Ankyramorpha
        - †Acleistorhinidae
        - - †Pareiasauromorpha
          - †Procolophonoidea
      - - †Mesosauridae
        - - - †Cabarzia
            - - †Ascendonanus
              - †Orovenator
          - Parapleurota
            - Neodiapsida
            - †Millerettidae
              - †Lanthanolania
              - - †Broomia
                - - †Milleropsis
                  - - †Milleretta
                    - †Millerosaurus

former 'parareptiles'
