= Lanthanolania =

Lanthanolania Temporal range: Wordian, 266 Ma

Scientific classification
- Kingdom: Animalia
- Phylum: Chordata
- Class: Reptilia
- Clade: Parapleurota
- Genus: †Lanthanolania; Modesto & Reisz, 2003

Type species
- †Lanthanolania ivakhnenkoi Modesto & Reisz, 2003

Extinct genus of reptiles

Lanthanolania (meaning "forgotten butcher") is an extinct genus of early reptile from Middle Permian (Wordian stage, or uppermost Kazanian in Eastern Europe) deposits of Arkhangelsk Oblast, Russia. The genus contains a single species, Lanthanolania ivakhnenkoi, known from the holotype and only specimen PIN 162/56, a nearly complete skull from the Glyadnaya Shchelya locality in Mesen District. It was named in 2003 by Sean P. Modesto and Robert R. Reisz.

== Phylogeny ==
In their 2003 description of Lanthanolania, Modesto and Reisz described this taxon as a diapsid reptile based on the triradiate (three-pronged) morphology of the postorbital and jugal. In some versions of their phylogenetic analyses, it was placed as a member of the Lepidosauromorpha within the reptile crown group, although the authors noted that additional research is needed on early reptiles to better understand their relationships. While they observed the ventral surface of the parasphenoid is flat, similar to millerettids, they concluded that the diapsid skull anatomy is inconsistent with a placement of Lanthanolania within this clade. In their 2011 description of Orovenator, Reisz, Modesto and Scott recovered Lanthanolania as a member of the Neodiapsida, diverging after Orovenator. These results are displayed in the cladogram below:

- - Captorhinidae
  - Diapsida
    - Araeoscelidia
    - Neodiapsida
      - Orovenator
      - - Lanthanolania
        - - Tangasauridae
          - - Younginidae
            - - Claudiosaurus
              - Sauria

In 2025, Jenkins et al. published the results of an expansive phylogenetic dataset incorporating synchrotron data, in which they identified Lanthanolania as the earliest-diverging member of the Millerettidae within the novel neoreptilian clade Parapleurota, outside of Neodiapsida. These results are displayed in Cladogram A below: Later that year, Buffa, Jenkins, and Benoit published a redescription of the Permian reptile Galesphyrus using a different matrix for their phylogenetic analysis. While Lanthanolania had to be trimmed from the analysis to achieve better resolution for the placement of Galesphyrus, earlier iterations of the analysis placed it in a position roughly equivalent to the base of Parapleurota (called 'Clade P' by these authors). The likely position of Lanthanolania is shown in Cladogram B below, inferred from the first analysis iteration.

Cladogram A: Jenkins et al. (2025)

- Neoreptilia
  - Ankyramorpha
  - - Mesosauridae
    - - - Cabarzia
        - - Ascendonanus
          - Orovenator
      - Parapleurota
        - Neodiapsida
        - Millerettidae
          - Lanthanolania
          - - Broomia
            - - Milleropsis
              - - Milleretta
                - Millerosaurus

Cladogram B: Buffa, Jenkins & Benoit (2025)

- Neoreptilia
  - - Mesosaurus
    - Procolophonia
  - 'Clade P' (≈Parapleurota)
    - Lanthanolania
    - Galesphyrus
    - - Neodiapsida
      - Millerettidae
        - Broomia
        - - Milleretta
          - Milleropsis
