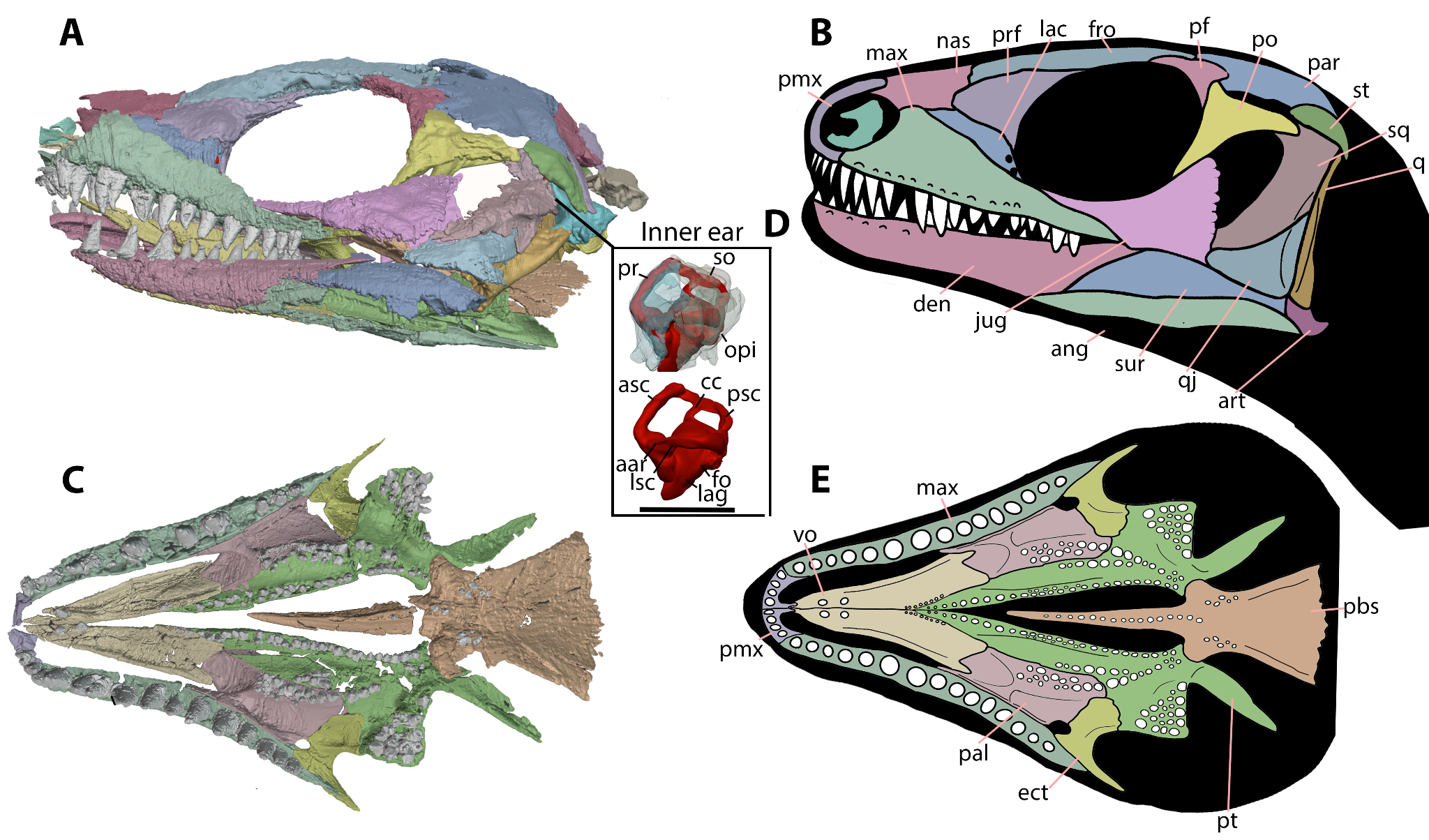
- Reconstructed skull and inner ear of Milleretta based on micro-CT scans

Scientific classification
- Kingdom: Animalia
- Phylum: Chordata
- Class: Reptilia
- Family: †Millerettidae
- Genus: †Milleretta; Broom, 1948

Type species
- †Milleretta rubidgei (Broom, 1947 [originally Millerina Broom 1938])

Synonyms
- Genus-level: Millerettoides Broom, 1948; Millerettops Broom, 1948; Millerosaurus Watson, 1957 Species-level: Millerettoides platyceps Broom, 1948; Millerettops kitchingi Broom, 1948; Millerosaurus ornatus Broom, 1948; Millerosaurus nuffieldi Waton, 1957; Millerina rubidgei Broom, 1938 [preoccupied by a genus of dipteran]

= Milleretta =

Milleretta Temporal range: Changhsingian, 252.5–251 Ma

Extinct genus of reptiles

Milleretta is an extinct genus of millerettid stem-group reptile from the Late Permian of what is now South Africa. Fossils have been found in the Balfour Formation. Its only known species is Milleretta rubidgei, although several other species of millerettid have been synonymized with this genus. Milleretta and its close relatives are unique among Paleozoic stem reptiles in that it secondarily closed an upper and lower temporal fenestra during ontogeny.

Milleretta was a moderately sized, lizard-like animal, about 60 centimetres (24 in) in length. It was probably insectivorous.

== Discovery ==
The name provided for this genus upon Robert Broom's original 1938 description was 'Millerina' , but it was later renamed in 1947 when Broom discovered that the name 'Millerina' had already been used for a genus of fly. The new name, Milleretta, means 'Miller's little one', referring to the Scottish geologist and stonemason, Hugh Miller. When Milleretta was first described, there was only one specimen known (specimen number BP/1/3821). As this was a juvenile specimen, there was uncertainty as to its classification. It wasn't until 1950 that an adult Milleretta was discovered by J.W. Kitching on Wildgebosch farm in New Bethesda, South Africa. This specimen (specimen number BP/1/2040) was found at the Dicynodon Assemblage zone. The finding at this zone established the same geographic range compared to other millerettids.

== Description ==
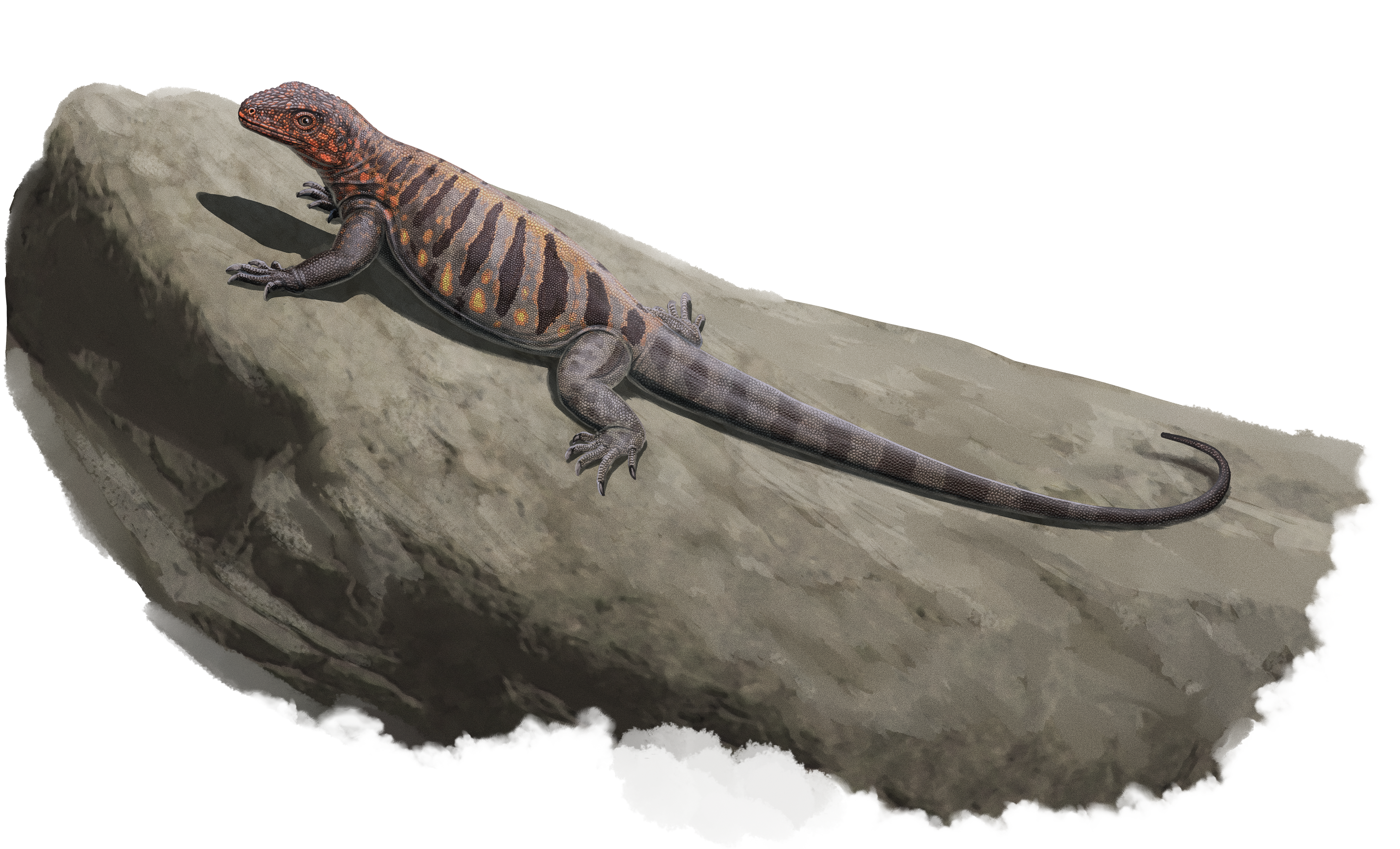
Speculative life restoration of Milleretta (work by Gabriel Ugueto)

The vertebrae of Milleretta have wide neural arches, in contrast to most neodiapsid reptiles. It had spines coming off the neural arches. Horizontally orientated zygopophyses are present, as well as prominent transverse processes. BP/1/2040's adult vertebrae contrast those of the juvenile specimen only with the fused centrum and arch in the adult. The ribs are especially sturdy dorsally, along with caudal expansions that help overlap the next rib over posteriorly. These holocephalus ribs contain crenelations. The thick ribs give protection to the cavity, but decrease the amount of flexibility of the body and decrease swiftness. Eunotosaurus, another possible millerosaur shares thick and overlapped ribs. Milleretta has plesiomorphic vertebrae and made its ribs wider by growing its bone out the shaft to airfoil-like section. In contrast, the trunk vertebrae of Eunotosaurus are stretched and it has T-shaped ribs with double articulations. Not only are the centrum and arch fused, but the pubes and ischia are fused in its pelvic girdle. Alongside the fused bones, the dorsal blade on the ilium is expanded width-wise. The femur becoming fully ossified, complete formation of articular ends at the limbs, and expanding ribs occur as Milleretta become adults. There was a single row of teeth on the palatine.

== Classification ==
First named in 1956, Millerettidae was a clade containing all reptiles closer to Milleretta rubidgei than to Macroleter poezicus. Millerettids were once considered among the most basal members of the parareptile lineage. Milleretta is now considered to be a derived member of the family, relative to Milleropsis and Broomia, with much of its superficially 'primitive' antatomy (e.g., closure of lower temporal fenestra) being independently acquired rather than ancestral for the Millerettidae. Eunotosaurus, which was also discovered in the Balfour Formation and lived around the same time as Milleretta, has sometimes been considered the sister taxon to Millerettidae.

The cladogram below displays the phylogenetic position of the Milleretta, from Ruta et al., 2011.

- Parareptilia
  - Mesosauria
    - Brazilosaurus sanpauloensis
    - Mesosaurus tenuidens
    - Stereosternum tumidum
  - - Eunotosaurus africanus
    - Millerettidae
      - Milleretta rubidgei
      - - Broomia perplexa
        - - "Millerosaurus" nuffieldi
          - - Milleropsis pricei
            - Millerosaurus ornatus
    - Procolophonomorpha
      - Australothyris smithi
      - Microleter mckinzieorum
      - Ankyramorpha

Subsequent research by Jenkins and colleagues (2025) based on synchrotron data and an expansive phylogenetic dataset recovered the Millerettidae as the sister group to the Neodiapsida, closer to the reptile crown group. Milleretta was recovered in a late-diverging position within the clade, as the sister taxon to the potentially synonymous Millerosaurus. These results are displayed in the cladogram below, with taxa traditionally regarded as 'parareptiles' highlighted:

- Sauropsida
  - †Araeoscelidia
  - - †Bolosauridae
    - Neoreptilia
      - †Ankyramorpha
        - †Acleistorhinidae
        - - †Pareiasauromorpha
          - †Procolophonoidea
      - - †Mesosauridae
        - - - †Cabarzia
            - - †Ascendonanus
              - †Orovenator
          - Parapleurota
            - Neodiapsida
            - †Millerettidae
              - †Lanthanolania
              - - †Broomia
                - - †Milleropsis
                  - - †Milleretta
                    - †Millerosaurus

former 'parareptiles'

== Paleobiology ==
Specimens of Milleretta both lived at the end of the Late-Permian (Changsingian). The vast range of sharp teeth helped make it possible to chew the insects present at the time. The tympanic fossa, or eardrum, of Milleretta possibly helped them hunt prey or avoid predators by detecting airborn sound.

Milleretta probably lived in a forest-like environment due to the preserved forest-floor litter from the Karoo Basin located in South Africa. A recent examination of soil profiles shows that the environment in which Milleretta lived became more dry as time moved on. This change in climate may have been caused by the mass-extinction that happened in the region. Right now, there is still some uncertainty of what the conditions were like, one reason is potentially the lack of geochemical studies done in the region.
