= Captorhinida =

Extinct order of reptiles

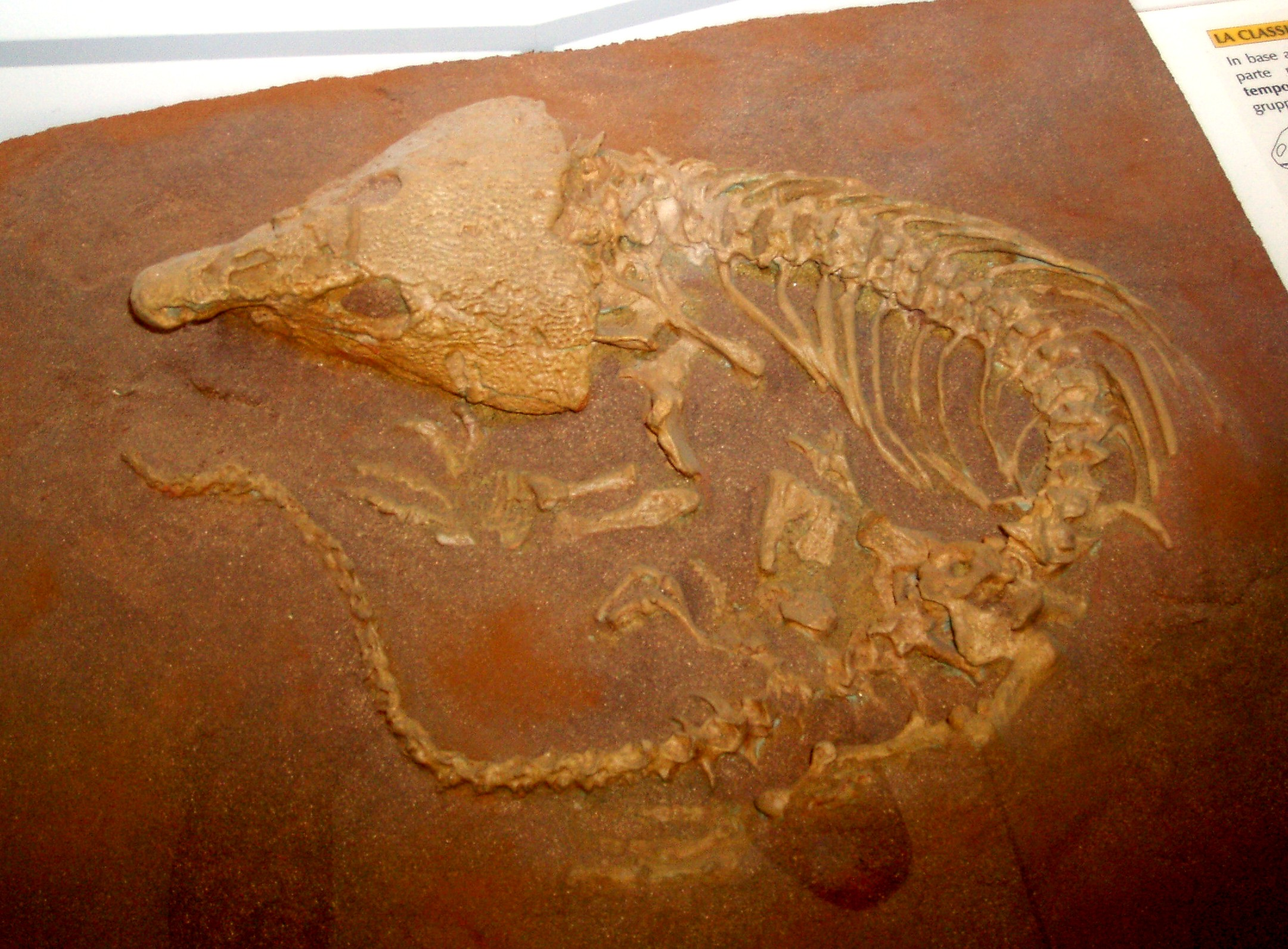
Fossil of Labidosaurus hamatus

Captorhinida (older name: Cotylosauria) is a doubly paraphyletic grouping of early reptiles. Robert L. Carroll (1988) ranked it as an order in the subclass Anapsida, composed of the following suborders:

- A paraphyletic Captorhinomorpha, containing the families Protorothyrididae, Captorhinidae, Bolosauridae, Acleistorhinidae and possibly also Batropetidae
- Procolophonia, containing families Nyctiphruretidae, Procolophonidae and Sclerosauridae
- Pareiasauroidea, with families Rhipaeosauridae and Pareiasauridae
- Millerosauroidea, with a single family Millerettidae.

While they all share primitive features and resemble the ancestors of all modern reptiles, some of these families are more closely related to (or belong to) the clade Parareptilia, while others are further along the line leading to diapsids. For this reason, the group is only used informally, if at all, by most modern paleontologists. All members of this group are thought to be extinct.
