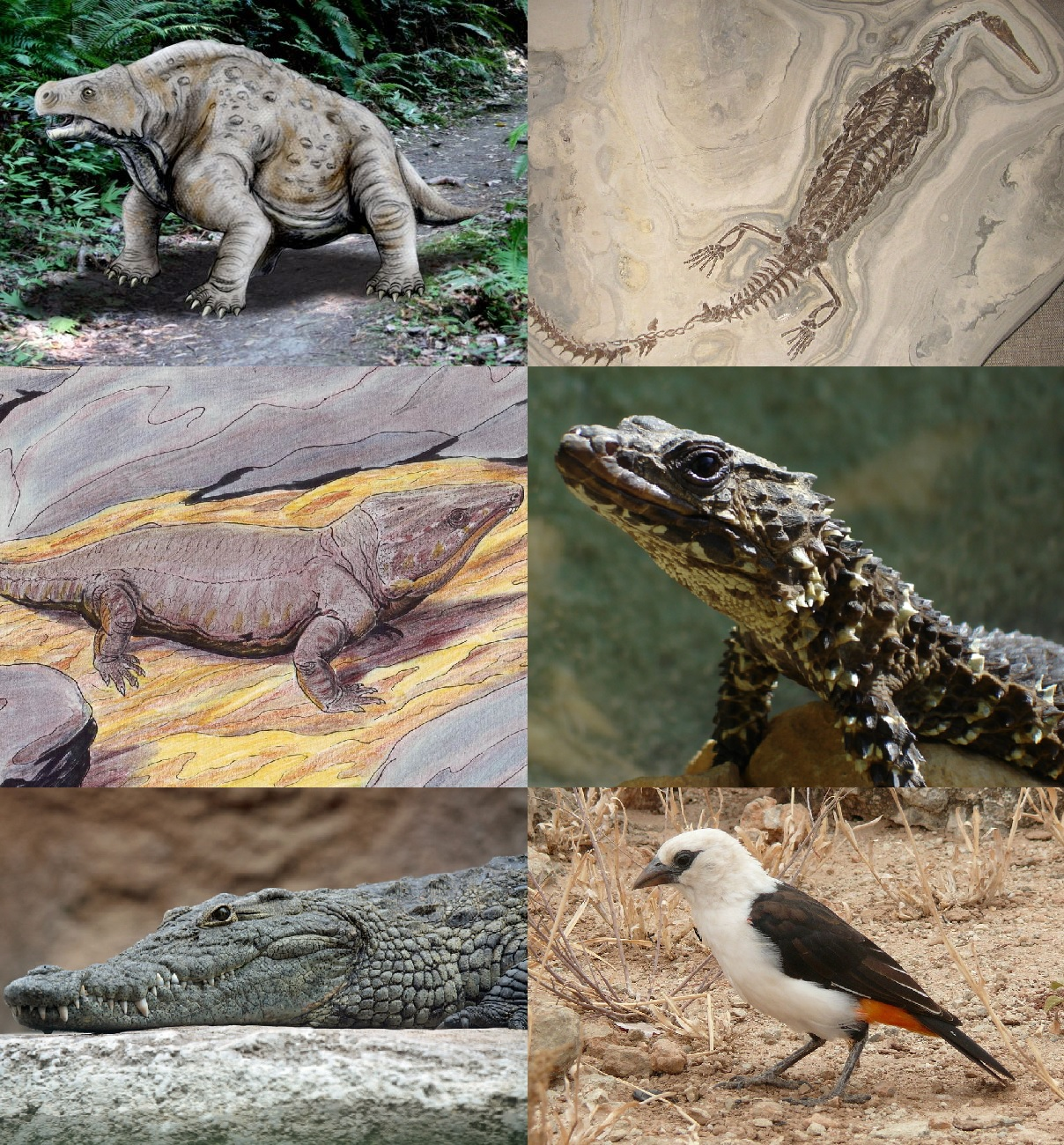
- Clockwise from top left: Pareiasaurus (an extinct pareiasaurian parareptile), Mesosaurus (an extinct mesosaurian parareptile), Smaug breyeri (a lizard), Dinemellia dinemelli (the white-faced buffalo-weaver), Crocodylus niloticus (the Nile crocodile), and Labidosaurikos (an extinct captorhinid eureptile)

Scientific classification
- Kingdom: Animalia
- Phylum: Chordata
- Clade: Tetrapoda
- Clade: Reptiliomorpha
- Clade: Amniota
- Clade: Sauropsida; Huxley, 1864

Subclades
- Revisionist view: †Erpetonyx; †Araeoscelidia?; †Bolosauridae; †Mesosauria; †Acleistorhinidae; †Australothyris; †Microleter; Neoreptilia; †Mesosauria?; †Acleistorhinidae?; †Australothyris?; †Microleter?; †Procolophonia; †Orovenator; †Cabarzia?; †Ascendonanus?; Parapleurota; †Millerettidae; †Galesphyrus; †Lanthanolania?; Neodiapsida; Traditional view: †Parareptilia; †Lanthanosuchidae; †Australothyris; †Erpetonyx; †Microleter; †Mesosauria; †Millerettidae; †Bolosauridae; †Acleistorhinidae; †Procolophonia; Eureptilia; †Captorhinidae; †Coelostegus; †Hylonomus; †Thuringothyris; †"Protorothyrididae"; Diapsida; †Araeoscelidia; Neodiapsida; Incertae sedis possible sauropsids: †Recumbirostra; †Captorhinidae; †Protorothyrididae; †Brouffia; †Paleothyris; †Coelostegus; †Caseasauria; †Varanopidae

Synonyms
- Reptilia sensu lato

= Sauropsida =

Sauropsids Temporal range: Late Carboniferous (Pennsylvanian)-Present

Taxonomic clade

Sauropsida (Greek for "lizard faces") is a clade of amniotes, broadly equivalent to the class Reptilia, though typically used in a broader sense to also include extinct stem-group relatives of modern non-avian reptiles and birds (which, as theropod dinosaurs, are nested within reptiles as more closely related to crocodilians than to lizards or turtles). The most popular definition states that Sauropsida is the sibling taxon to Synapsida, the other clade of amniotes which includes mammals as its only modern representatives. Although early synapsids have historically been referred to as "mammal-like reptiles", all synapsids are more closely related to mammals than to any modern reptile. Sauropsids, on the other hand, include all amniotes more closely related to modern reptiles than to mammals. This includes Aves (birds), which are a group of theropod dinosaurs despite originally being named as a separate class in Linnaean taxonomy.

The base of Sauropsida is traditionally divided into main groups of "reptiles": Eureptilia ("true reptiles") and Parareptilia ("next to reptiles"). Eureptilia encompasses all living reptiles (including birds), as well as various extinct groups. Parareptilia is typically considered to be an entirely extinct group, though a few hypotheses for the origin of turtles have suggested that they belong to the parareptiles. The clades Recumbirostra and Varanopidae, traditionally thought to be lepospondyls and synapsids respectively, may also be basal sauropsids. The term "Sauropsida" originated in 1864 with Thomas Henry Huxley, who grouped birds with reptiles based on fossil evidence. The divisions of "Eureptilia" and "Parareptilia" have been challenged in a number of recent studies, who find that they do not represent monophyletic groups.

During the Permian, sauropsids were predominately small, although some pareiasaurian parareptiles weighed over 1,000 kg (2,200 lb), approaching the size of the largest dinocephalians. Following the Permian-Triassic extinction event, sauropsids would come to replace synapsids as the dominant group of tetrapods. During the Mesozoic, they diversified in marine, aerial, and terrestrial ecosystems. Sauropsids suffered a decline in diversity following the Cretaceous-Paleogene extinction event, which saw the extinction of all non-avian dinosaurs, pterosaurs, and marine reptiles such as mosasaurs and plesiosaurs.

Following the K-Pg extinction, mammals, the only living group of synapsids diversified and filled the niches left vacant following the extinction of the dinosaurs. Despite this, the remaining sauropsids also diversified, with sauropsids making up roughly 20,000 species, over twice the number of mammals, which have roughly 6,800 species.

== History of classification ==
=== Huxley and the fossil gaps ===
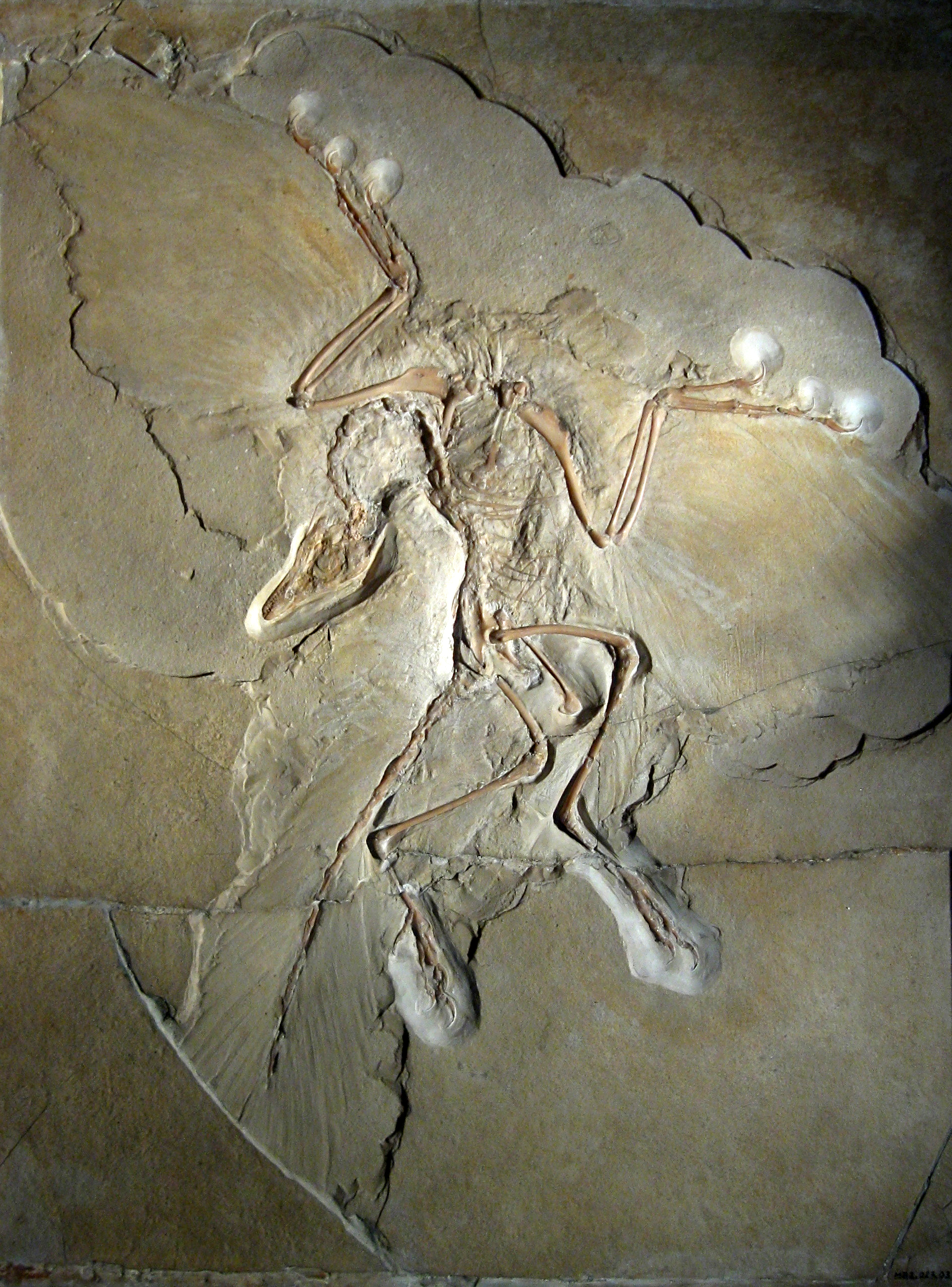
The Berlin specimen of Archaeopteryx lithographica, a historically important fossil which helped to establish birds as a component of the reptile family tree

The term Sauropsida ("lizard faces") has a long history, and hails back to Thomas Henry Huxley, who first used the term in 1863, originally using the term "sauroids" and his opinion that birds had risen from the dinosaurs. He based this chiefly on the fossils of Hesperornis and Archaeopteryx, that were starting to become known at the time. In the Hunterian lectures delivered at the Royal College of Surgeons in 1863, Huxley grouped the vertebrate classes informally into mammals, sauroids, and ichthyoids (the latter containing the anamniotes), based on the gaps in physiological traits and lack of transitional fossils that seemed to exist between the three groups. Early in the following year he proposed the names Sauropsida and Ichthyopsida for the two latter. Huxley did however include groups on the mammalian line (synapsids) like Dicynodon among the sauropsids. Thus, under the original definition, Sauropsida contained not only the groups usually associated with it today, but also several groups that today are known to be in the mammalian side of the tree. Huxley stated in an 1867 lecture that "The members of the class Aves so nearly approach the Reptilia in all the essential and fundamental points of their structure, that the phrase 'Birds and greatly modified Reptiles' would hardly be an exaggerated expression of the closeness of that resemblance."

=== Sauropsids redefined (Goodrich, 1916) ===
By the early 20th century, the fossils of Permian synapsids from South Africa had become well known, allowing palaeontologists to trace synapsid evolution in much greater detail. The term Sauropsida was taken up by E. S. Goodrich in 1916 much like Huxley's, to include lizards, birds and their relatives. He distinguished them from mammals and their extinct relatives, which he included in the sister group Theropsida (now usually replaced with the name Synapsida). Goodrich's classification thus differs somewhat from Huxley's, in which the non-mammalian synapsids (or at least the dicynodontians) fell under the sauropsids. Goodrich supported this division by the nature of the hearts and blood vessels in each group, and other features such as the structure of the forebrain. According to Goodrich, both lineages evolved from an earlier stem group, the Protosauria ("first lizards"), which included some Paleozoic amphibians as well as early reptiles predating the sauropsid/synapsid split (and thus not true sauropsids). His concept differed from modern classifications in that he considered a modified fifth metatarsal to be an apomorphy of the group, leading him to place Sauropterygia, Mesosauria and possibly Ichthyosauria and Araeoscelida in the Theropsida.

=== Detailing the reptile family tree ===
In 1956, D. M. S. Watson observed that sauropsids and synapsids diverged very early in the reptilian evolutionary history, and so he divided Goodrich's Protosauria between the two groups. He also reinterpreted the Sauropsida and Theropsida to exclude birds and mammals respectively, making them paraphyletic, unlike Goodrich's definition. Thus his Sauropsida included Procolophonia, Eosuchia, Protorosauria, Millerosauria, Chelonia (turtles), Squamata (lizards and snakes), Rhynchocephalia, Rhynchosauria, Choristodera, Thalattosauria, Crocodilia, "thecodonts" (paraphyletic basal Archosauria), non-avian dinosaurs, pterosaurs and sauropyterygians. However, his concept differed from the modern one in that he placed reptiles without an otic notch, such as araeoscelids and captorhinids, with the theropsids.

This classification supplemented, but was never as popular as, the classification of the reptiles (according to Romer's classic Vertebrate Paleontology) into four subclasses according to the positioning of temporal fenestrae, openings in the sides of the skull behind the eyes. Since the advent of phylogenetic nomenclature, the term Reptilia has fallen out of favor with many taxonomists, who have used Sauropsida in its place to include a monophyletic group containing the traditional reptiles and the birds.

=== Cladistic definitions ===
Sauropsida and the 19th-/20th-century conception of the class Reptilia. Both are superimposed on a cladogram of tetrapods, showing the difference in coverage.

The class Reptilia has been known to be an evolutionary grade rather than a clade for as long as evolution has been recognised. Reclassifying reptiles has been among the key aims of phylogenetic nomenclature. The term Sauropsida had from the mid 20th century been used to denote a branch-based clade containing all amniote species which are not on the synapsid side of the split between reptiles and mammals. This group encompasses all now-living reptiles as well as birds, and as such is comparable to Goodrich's classification. The main difference is that better resolution of the early amniote tree has split up most of Goodrich's "Protosauria", though definitions of Sauropsida essentially identical to Huxley's (i.e. including the mammal-like reptiles) are also forwarded. Some later cladistic work has used Sauropsida more restrictively, to signify the crown group, i.e. all descendants of the last common ancestor of extant reptiles and birds. A number of phylogenetic stem, node and crown definitions have been published, anchored in a variety of fossil and extant organisms, thus there is currently no consensus of the actual definition (and thus content) of Sauropsida as a phylogenetic unit.

Some taxonomists, such as Benton (2004), have co-opted the term to fit into traditional rank-based classifications, making Sauropsida and Synapsida class-level taxa to replace the traditional Class Reptilia, while Modesto and Anderson (2004), using the PhyloCode standard, have suggested replacing the name Sauropsida with their redefinition of Reptilia, arguing that the latter is by far better known and should have priority.

Cladistic definitions of Sauropsida include:

- Sauropsida as the total group of reptiles: "Reptiles plus all other amniotes more closely related to them than they are to mammals" (Gauthier, 1994). This is a branch-based total group definition. Gauthier (1994) considered turtles to be descended from parareptiles, thus defining Reptilia as a more restricted crown group encompassing diapsids and parareptiles (apart from mesosaurs, which he considered to be the most basal branch of sauropsids).
- Sauropsida as a total group, synonymous with Reptilia sensu lato: "The most inclusive clade containing Lacerta agilis and Crocodylus niloticus, but not Homo sapiens" (Modesto & Anderson, 2004). This total group definition leaves the question of turtle ancestry unresolved.
- Sauropsida as a broad node-based group: "The last common ancestor of mesosaurs, testudines and diapsids, and all its descendants" (Laurin & Reisz, 1995). Though formulated differently, this grouping was similar in scope and intention to the definition provided by Gauthier (1994).

=== Subdivisions ===
Eureptilia ("true reptiles") is one of the two traditional major subgroups of the clade Sauropsida, the other one being Parareptilia. Eureptilia includes Diapsida (the clade containing all modern reptiles and birds), as well as a number of primitive Permo-Carboniferous forms previously classified under Anapsida, in the old (no longer recognised) order "Cotylosauria", including Captorhinidae as well as Hylonomus and the "protorothyrids".

Eureptilia is characterized by the skull having greatly reduced supraoccipital, tabular, and supratemporal bones that are no longer in contact with the postorbital. Aside from Diapsida, the group notably contains Captorhinidae, a diverse and long lived (Late Carboniferous-Late Permian) clade of initially small carnivores that later evolved into large herbivores. Other primitive eureptiles such as the "protorothyrids" were all small, superficially lizard-like forms, that were probably insectivorous. One primitive eureptile, the Late Carboniferous "protorothyrid" Anthracodromeus, is the oldest known climbing tetrapod. Diapsids were the only eureptilian clade to continue beyond the end of the Permian.

The traditional classification of sauropsids and eureptiles has been challenged in recent studies, with several studies in the early 2020s finding that "Parareptilia" is paraphyletic, and the supposed "eureptilian" captorhinids and Protorothyris are not even sauropsids, but stem-amniotes, and that araeoscelidians are not closely related to true diapsids, if they are even sauropsids at all, and that the famous "earliest reptile" Hylonomus may also not be a true sauropsid. In 2019 the new clade Neoreptilia was coined as the clade uniting Parareptilia and Neodiapsida, under the phylogenetic hypothesis that parareptiles were monophyletic and relatively derived, placed as closer to neodiapsids than araeoscelidians, Hylonomus, "protorothyrids" and varanopids (the last of which are conventionally viewed as synapsids). This clade was later reused by other scholars in a different sense to include parts of former Parareptilia that were considered close to Neodiapsida, which in one paper included only Procolophonia, and Neodiapsida, while another paper included Mesosauria and Acleistorhinidae within Neoreptilia in addition to the aforementioned taxa.

A 2025 paper named the new clade Parapleurota within Sauropsida, comprising the former parareptile family Millerettidae and Neodiapsida, which the paper found to be sister groups. The group is formally defined as the clade containing the most recent common ancestor of Milleretta rubidgei and Youngina capensis, but not Petrolacosaurus kansensis, Orovenator mayorum, Procolophon trigoniceps, or Mesosaurus tenuidens. Expanded phylogenetic analyses have subsequently found support for this clade. Members of the Parapleurota are distinguished by the presence of a tympanic membrane inside the ear. This allows airborne sounds to be efficiently transmitted through the ear, and is typically associated with heightened hearing ability. Developmental biology and the fossil record both indicate that the presence of a tympanic ear is ancestral to extant reptiles. Parapleurota displays stepwise evolution of the tympanic fossa, an opening in the back of the skull that holds the membrane. In basal members of the clade, the membrane is supported by the squamosal and quadratojugal, while in Neodiapsida it is mostly or entirely supported by the quadrate. Tympanic membranes also evolved independently in Procolophonia and stem-mammals.

== Distinguishing traits ==
A 2025 study suggested that Sauropsida is ancestrally characterised by seven unambiguous apomorphies (derived traits) relative to the ancestral amniote condition, including: the presence of a contact zone between the prefrontal and palatal bones of the skull, the skull roof lacks fossae (depressions) for the insertion (anchoring) of epaxial muscles, the Meckelian canal pierces the front (anterior) end of the dentary bone of the lower jaw, the neural spines of the caudal (tail) vertebrae are "moderately tall", the front (anterior) margin of the scapula bone is convex, the supinator process of the humerus bone is transversely narrow, there is a single pedal centrale bone in the hindfoot, suborbital foramen (holes in the skull near the eye sockets for blood vessels and/or nerves) are present, and the stapes (bones involved in hearing) are rod-like.^{supplemental material}

=== Brain structure ===
The cranial endocasts, and consequently the inferred brain anatomy, of early sauropsids is poorly known. Different from how living mammals have their cortex in six different layers of neurons which is called neocortex, the cerebrum of living sauropsids has a completely different structure. For the corresponding structure of the cerebrum in the classic view, the neocortex of mammals is homologous with only the archicortex of the avian brain. However, in the modern view appeared since the 1960s, behavioral studies suggested that avian neostriatum and hyperstriatum can receive signals of vision, hearing, and body sensations, which means they act just like the neocortex. Comparing an avian brain to that to a mammal, nuclear-to-layered hypothesis proposed by Karten (1969), suggested that the cells which form layers in synapsids' neocortex, gather individually by type and form several nuclei. For synapsids, when one new function is adapted in evolution it will be assigned to a separate area of cortex, so for each function, synapsids will have to develop a separate area of cortex, and damage to that specific cortex may cause disability. However, for Sauropsida functions are disassembled and assigned to all nuclei. In this case, brain function is highly flexible for sauropsids, even with a small brain, many sauropsids can still have a relatively high intelligence compared to mammals, for example, birds in the family Corvidae. So, it is possible that some non-avian dinosaurs, like Tyrannosaurus, which had tiny brains compared to their enormous body size, were more intelligent than previously thought.

== Evolutionary history ==
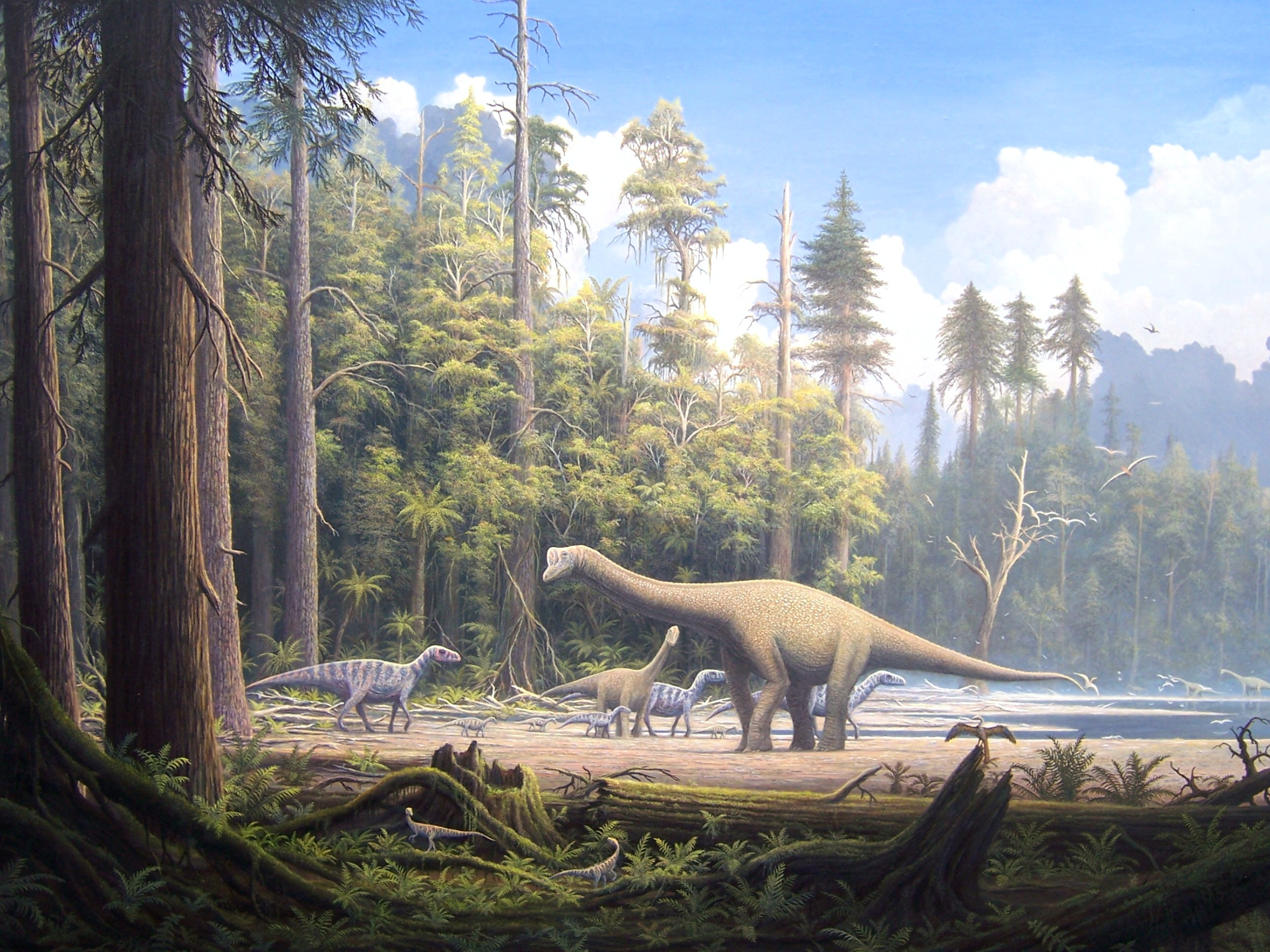
Mesozoic sauropsids: non-avialan dinosaurs (Europasaurus and iguanodonts) alongside the early bird Archaeopteryx perched on the foreground tree stump.

Sauropsids evolved from stem amniotes approximately 315 million years ago, in the Carboniferous Period of the Paleozoic Era. Although a 2025 study claimed that clawed footprints from the Snowy Plains Formation of Australia, dating to c. 350 mya, represented much older evidence of sauropsids, under the assumption that claws were distinctive to amniotes, the presence of claws in Westlothiana (once hailed as the earliest reptile, but now considered a stem-tetrapod less closely related to reptiles than modern amphibians are) suggests that claws cannot be considered a distinctive characteristic of amniotes or reptiles, and thus their presence in the footprints cannot be used to date the timing of sauropsid origin. The oldest unambiguous fossils of sauropsids date to the end of the Late Carboniferous, after 306 million years ago. During the following Permian perhaps, sauropsids were mostly small sized, with the exception of the up to oxen-sized pareiasaurs.

In the Mesozoic Era (from about 250 million years ago to about 66 million years ago), sauropsids were the largest animals on land, in the water, and in the air. The Mesozoic is sometimes called the Age of Reptiles. In the Cretaceous–Paleogene extinction event, the large-bodied sauropsids died out in the global extinction event at the end of the Mesozoic era. With the exception of a few species of birds, the entire dinosaur lineage became extinct; in the following era, the Cenozoic, the remaining birds diversified so extensively that, today, nearly one out of every three species of land vertebrate is a bird species.

== Phylogeny ==
The cladogram presented here illustrates the "family tree" of sauropsids, and follows a simplified version of the relationships found by M.S. Lee, in 2013. All genetic studies have supported the hypothesis that turtles (formerly categorized together with ancient anapsids) are diapsid reptiles, despite lacking any skull openings behind their eye sockets; some studies have even placed turtles among the archosaurs, though a few have recovered turtles as lepidosauromorphs instead. The cladogram below used a combination of genetic (molecular) and fossil (morphological) data to obtain its results.

- Amniota
  - Synapsida (mammals and their extinct relatives)
  - Sauropsida / Reptilia (total group)
    - †Parareptilia
      - †Millerettidae
      - unnamed
        - †Eunotosaurus
        - †Ankyramorpha
          - †Lanthanosuchidae
          - †Procolophonia
            - †Pareiasauromorpha
            - †Procolophonoidea
    - Eureptilia
      - †Captorhinidae
      - Romeriida
        - †Paleothyris
        - Diapsida
          - †Araeoscelidia
          - Neodiapsida
            - †Claudiosaurus
            - - †Younginiformes
              - Crown Reptilia/ Sauria
                - Pan-Lepidosauria/ Lepidosauromorpha
                  - †Kuehneosauridae
                  - Lepidosauria
                    - Rhynchocephalia (tuatara and their extinct relatives)
                    - Squamata (lizards and snakes)
                - Archelosauria/ Archosauromorpha s. l.
                  - Pan-Testudines/ Pantestudines
                    - †Eosauropterygia
                    - - †Placodontia
                      - - †Sinosaurosphargis
                        - - †Odontochelys
                          - Testudinata
                            - †Proganochelys
                            - Testudines (turtles)
                  - Pan-Archosauria
                    - †Choristodera
                    - Archosauromorpha s. s.
                      - †Prolacertiformes
                      - - - †Rhynchosauria
                          - †Trilophosaurus
                        - Archosauriformes (crocodilians, birds, and extinct relatives)

Laurin & Piñeiro (2017) and Modesto (2019) proposed an alternate phylogeny of basal sauropsids. In this tree, parareptiles include turtles and are closely related to non-araeoscelidian diapsids. The family Varanopidae, otherwise included in Synapsida, is considered by Modesto a sauropsid group.

- - Synapsida
    (mammals and allies)
  - Sauropsida
    - Mesosauridae
    - - Captorhinidae
      - - Araeoscelidia
        - - Paleothyris
          - Varanopidae
          - - Parareptilia
            - Eosuchia

In a number of recent studies, the "microsaur" clade Recumbirostra, historically considered lepospondyl reptiliomorphs, have been recovered as early sauropsids, though this assertion has been disputed by a number of authors, who contend that microsaurs are still reptillomorph stem-amniotes.

Simoes et al (2022) found Captorhinidae, Protorothyris and Araeoscelidia to form a clade that was the sister group to crown Amniota (containing true sauropsids and synapsids). The same study also considered parareptiles to be polyphyletic, with some groups being closer to the crown group of reptiles than others.

Cladogram after Simoes et al (2022):

- Reptiliomorpha
  - Seymouriamorpha
  - - Diadectomorpha
    - - - Araeoscelidia
        - - Protorothyris
          - Captorhinidae
      - Amniota
        - Synapsida
        - Sauropsida
          - Acleistorhinidae
          - - Millerettidae
            - - Mesosauria
              - Neoreptilia
                - Procolophonia
                - Neodiapsida (including modern reptiles and birds)

This cladogram follows Jenkins et al. (2025). Traditional "parareptiles" are highlighted in orange:

- Sauropsida
  - †Araeoscelidia
  - - †Bolosauridae
    - - †Erpetonyx
      - Neoreptilia
        - †Ankyramorpha
          - †Acleistorhinidae
          - Procolophonia
            - †Pareiasauromorpha
            - †Procolophonoidea
        - - †Mesosauridae
          - - - †Cabarzia
              - - †Ascendonanus
                - †Orovenator
            - Parapleurota
              - †Millerettidae
              - Neodiapsida
                - †Younginidae
                - - †Tangasauridae
                  - - †Weigeltisauridae
                    - - †Claudiosaurus
                      - Sauria
                        - Lepidosauromorpha
                        - Archosauromorpha
