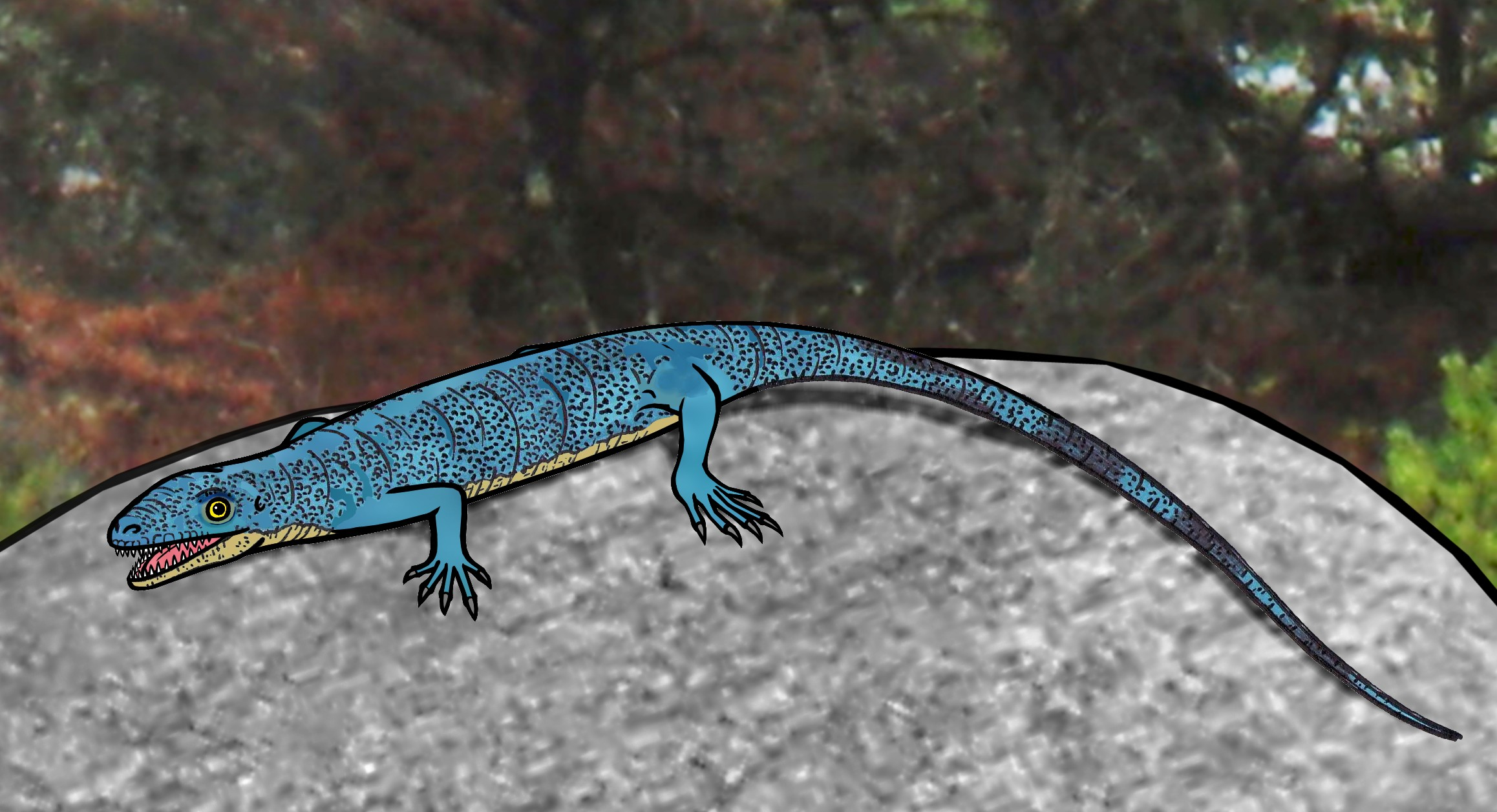
- Reconstruction of Millerosaurus lying on a stone.

Scientific classification
- Kingdom: Animalia
- Phylum: Chordata
- Class: Reptilia
- Family: †Millerettidae
- Genus: †Millerosaurus; Broom, 1948

Species
- †M. ornatus Broom, 1948 (type); †"M." nuffieldi Watson, 1957

= Millerosaurus =

Millerosaurus Temporal range: Late Permian, Changhsingian

Extinct genus of reptiles

Millerosaurus is an extinct genus of millerettid reptiles from the Late Permian (Changhsingian stage) of South Africa. Jenkins et al. (2025) recognized both species of Millerosaurus as juvenile individuals of Milleretta, since the observed anatomical differences can be explained by changes seen through ontogeny in the latter. Under this reinterpretation, Millerosaurus would be a junior synonym of Milleretta.
