= Kenyasaurus =

Kenyasaurus Temporal range: Early Triassic 252–247 Ma

Scientific classification
- Domain: Eukaryota
- Kingdom: Animalia
- Phylum: Chordata
- Class: Reptilia
- Clade: Neodiapsida
- Genus: †Kenyasaurus; Harris & Carroll, 1977

Type species
- †Kenyasaurus mariakaniensis Harris & Carroll 1977

Extinct genus of reptiles

Kenyasaurus is an extinct genus of basal tangasaurid known from the Early Triassic period of Coast Province, southeastern Kenya. It contains a single species, Kenyasaurus mariakaniensis.

== Discovery ==
Kenyasaurus is known only from the holotype specimen, KNM-MA1, a well preserved and partially complete postcranial skeleton, lacking much of the neck, pectoral girdle and forelimb, which is hosted at the Kenya National Museum. It was found at the Mariakani locality which is located 25 miles from Mombasa, southeastern Kenya. It was collected from the upper part of the Maji ya Chumvi Beds (Maji-Ya-Chumvi Formation). These beds form the lower part of the Middle Duruma Sandstone Series (Duruma Group) and on the basis of lithological similarities with beds in Tanzania and Madagascar were dated to the Induan and Olenekian stages of the Early Triassic period, about 251.0-245 million years ago. This specimen represents the only reptilian fossils currently known from these beds.

== Description ==
Kenyasaurus is a relatively small, lightly built, general lizard-like form. In Kenyasaurus original description, Harris and Carroll (1977) assigned it to the "Eosuchia" (a defunct clade that used to unit all diapsids more advanced than Araeoscelis) on the basis of its well developed sternum and that the fifth distal tarsal is not a separate element, but the fifth metatarsal is not hooked. It was considered to be most closely related to the aquatic eosuchians Tangasaurus and Hovasaurus (from Tanzania and Madagascar) based on its small size and general body proportions. Harris and Carroll noted that its tail is not specialized as a swimming organ as it is in tangasaurids.

Philip J. Currie (1982) redescribed Tangasaurus and its relationships with other "eosuchians". He diagnosed Kenyasaurus on the basis of five autapomorphies: It possesses low but anteroposteriorly elongate neural spines in the dorsal region, 56 caudal vertebrae and 28 pairs of caudal ribs and transverse processes. Its astragalus is almost triangular rather than primitive L-shape and it has pronounced process on fifth metatarsal for insertion of peroneus brevis. Currie (1982) united two subfamilies within the Tangasauridae: Kenyasaurinae (that he named to include Kenyasaurus and Thadeosaurus, both are thought to be terrestrial) and Tangasaurinae (to include the aquatic Tangasaurus and Hovasaurus). He allied Tangasauridae and Youngina together within superfamily Younginoidea which he named. Currie (1980) named Acerosodontosaurus, and allied it with Younginoidea in the clade Younginiformes. Currie's (1982) classification of the Younginiformes had been accepted by many scientists before they could perform large and computerized analyses.

More recent works that use phylogenetic analyses usually suggest that neither Younginoidea nor Younginiformes are monophyletic. Constanze Bickelmann, Johannes Müller and Robert R. Reisz (2009) redescribed Acerosodontosaurus and suggested an aquatic lifestyle for it. Their analysis is figured below, and it found support for two distinct families within "Younginiformes": the aquatic Tangasauridae, and the terrestrial Younginidae (in partial polytomy with Tangasauridae). However, they found no support for the inclusion of Kenyasaurus within any of those families. More resolved results were obtained by Reisz et al. (2011) in their description of Orovenator. However, those results required the exclusion of the fragmentary taxa Galesphyrus, Kenyasaurus, Palaeagama and Saurosternon from their analysis.

- Diapsida
  - Araeoscelidia
  - Neodiapsida
    - Lanthanolania
    - Kenyasaurus
    - - Tangasauridae
        - Tangasaurus
        - - Acerosodontosaurus
          - Hovasaurus
      - Youngina
      - - Galesphyrus
        - Thadeosaurus
    - - Claudiosaurus
      - - - Palaeagama
          - Saurosternon
        - - Coelurosauravus
          - Sauria

== Etymology ==
Kenyasaurus was first described and named by John M. Harris and Robert L. Carroll in 1977 and the type species is Kenyasaurus mariakaniensis. The generic name is derived from the name of the Kenya in which the only known specimen was found, and Greek sauros, meaning "lizard". The specific name is derived from the name of the type locality of the genus, Mariakani.
