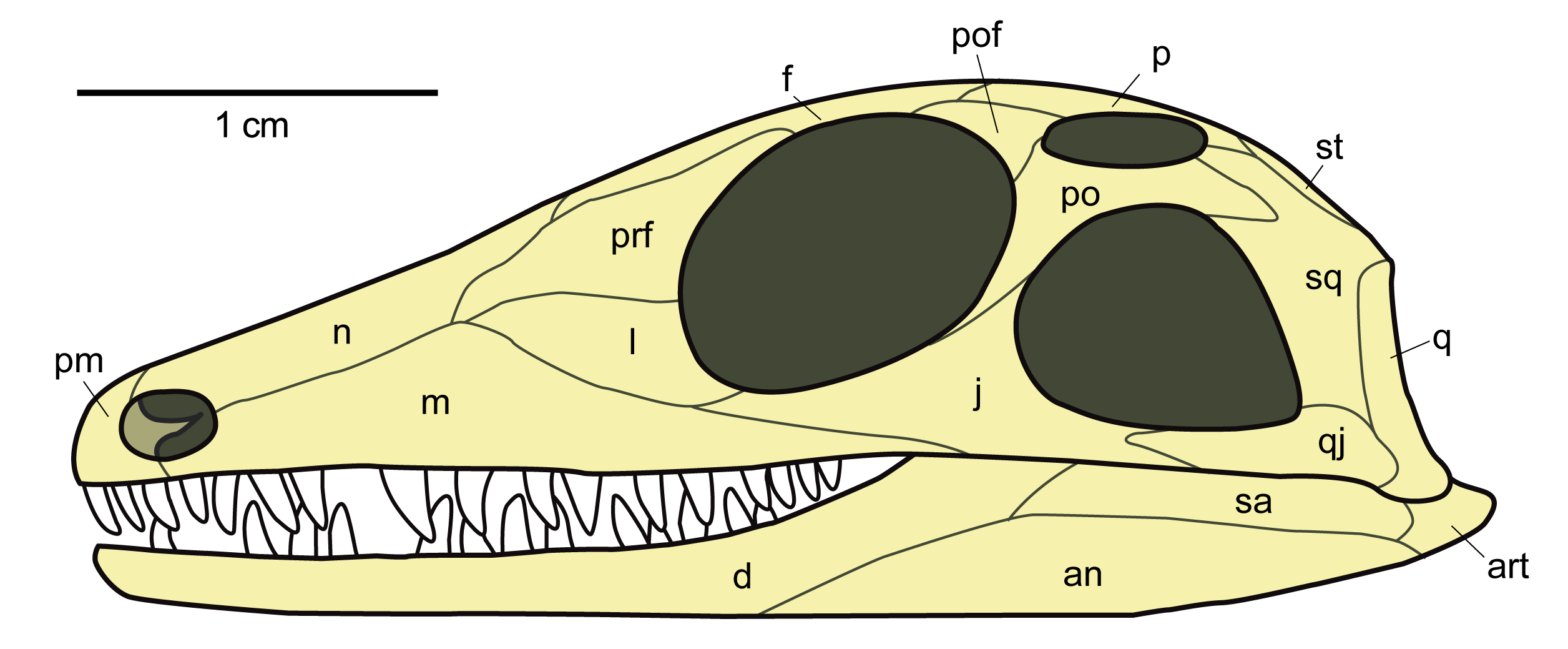
- Skull of Youngina
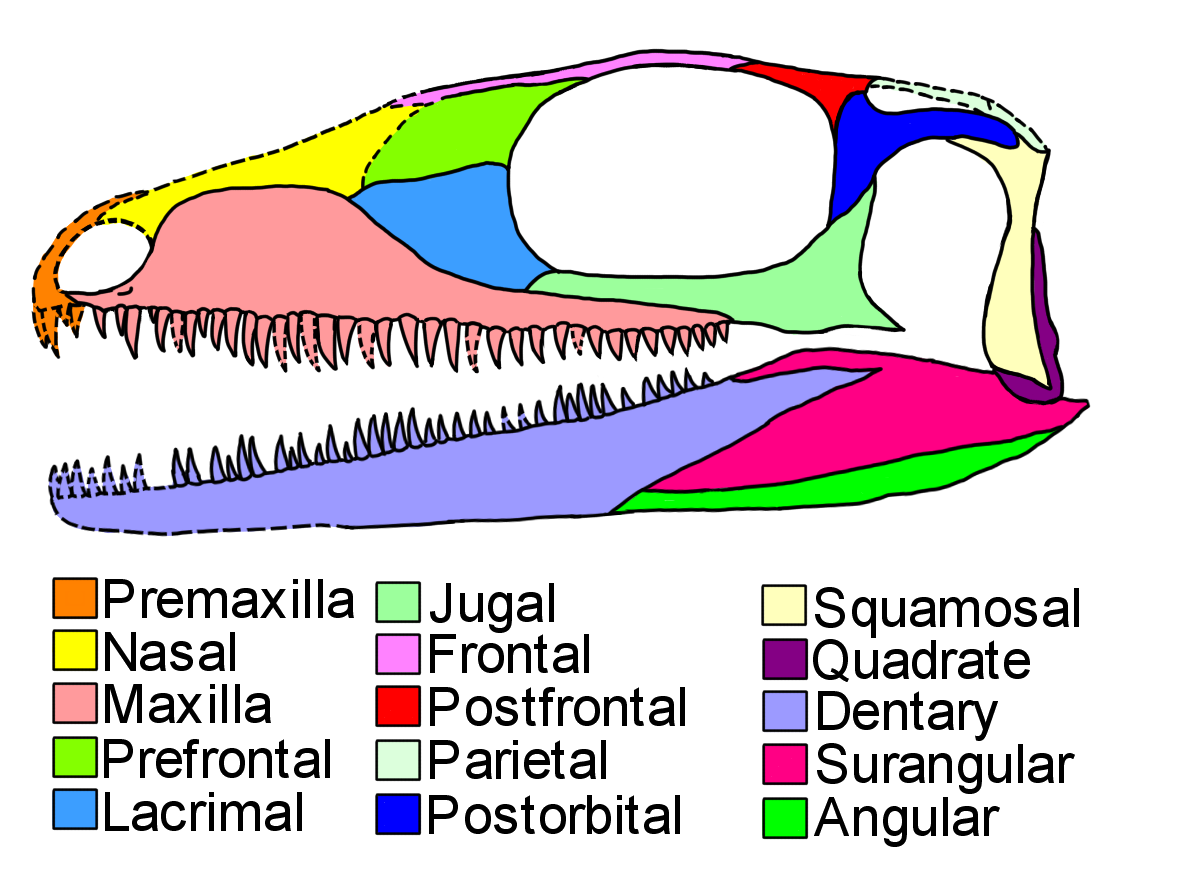
- Skull of Acerosodontosaurus

Scientific classification
- Kingdom: Animalia
- Phylum: Chordata
- Class: Reptilia
- Clade: Neodiapsida
- Order: †Younginiformes; Romer, 1945

Subgroups
- †Saurosternon?; †Tangasauridae Piveteau, 1926; †Acerosodontosaurus; †Hovasaurus; †Kenyasaurus; †Tangasaurus; †Thadeosaurus; †Younginidae Broom, 1914; †Akkedops; †Scyllacerta; †Youngina

= Younginiformes =

Younginiformes Temporal range: Late Permian–Early Triassic

Extinct group of reptiles

Younginiformes is a potential group of diapsid reptiles known from the Permian–Triassic of Africa. It has been used as a replacement for the more problematically defined "Eosuchia". Younginiforms were historically suggested to be lepidosauromorphs, but are now regarded as basal non-saurian neodiapsids. Some younginiforms like Hovasaurus and Acerosodontosaurus are thought to have had an amphibious lifestyle, while others like Kenyasaurus, Thadeosaurus and younginids were probably terrestrial. While sometimes recovered as monophyletic, it is often recovered as paraphyletic.

== Classification ==
Eosuchia is generally seen as comprising two families, Tangasauridae and Younginidae. The monophyly of the group—whether tangasaurids and younginids form a clade rather than distinct branches—is disputed. A 2009 study found them to be an unresolved polytomy at the base of Neodiapsida. In their 2011 description of Orovenator, Reisz et al. recovered the group as paraphyletic. These results are displayed in Topology A below. A 2022 study by Simões et al. recovered the Younginiformes as a monophyletic group of basal neodiapsid reptiles, also including Claudiosaurus and Saurosternon as part of the group. These results are displayed in Topology B below.

Topology B: Results of Reisz et al. (2011)

- Neodiapsida
  - †Orovenator
  - - †Lanthanolania
    - - †Tangasauridae
        - †Tangasaurus
        - - †Acerosodontosaurus
          - †Hovasaurus
      - - †Younginidae
          - †Thadeosaurus
          - †Youngina
        - - †Claudiosaurus
          - Sauria

Topology B: Results of Simões et al. (2022)

- Neodiapsida
  - †Younginiformes
    - - †Claudiosaurus
      - †Youngina
    - - †Hovasaurus
      - - †Acerosodontosaurus
        - †Saurosternon
  - - †Eunotosaurus
    - - †Weigeltisauridae
      - Sauria
        - Archelosauria
        - Lepidosauromorpha

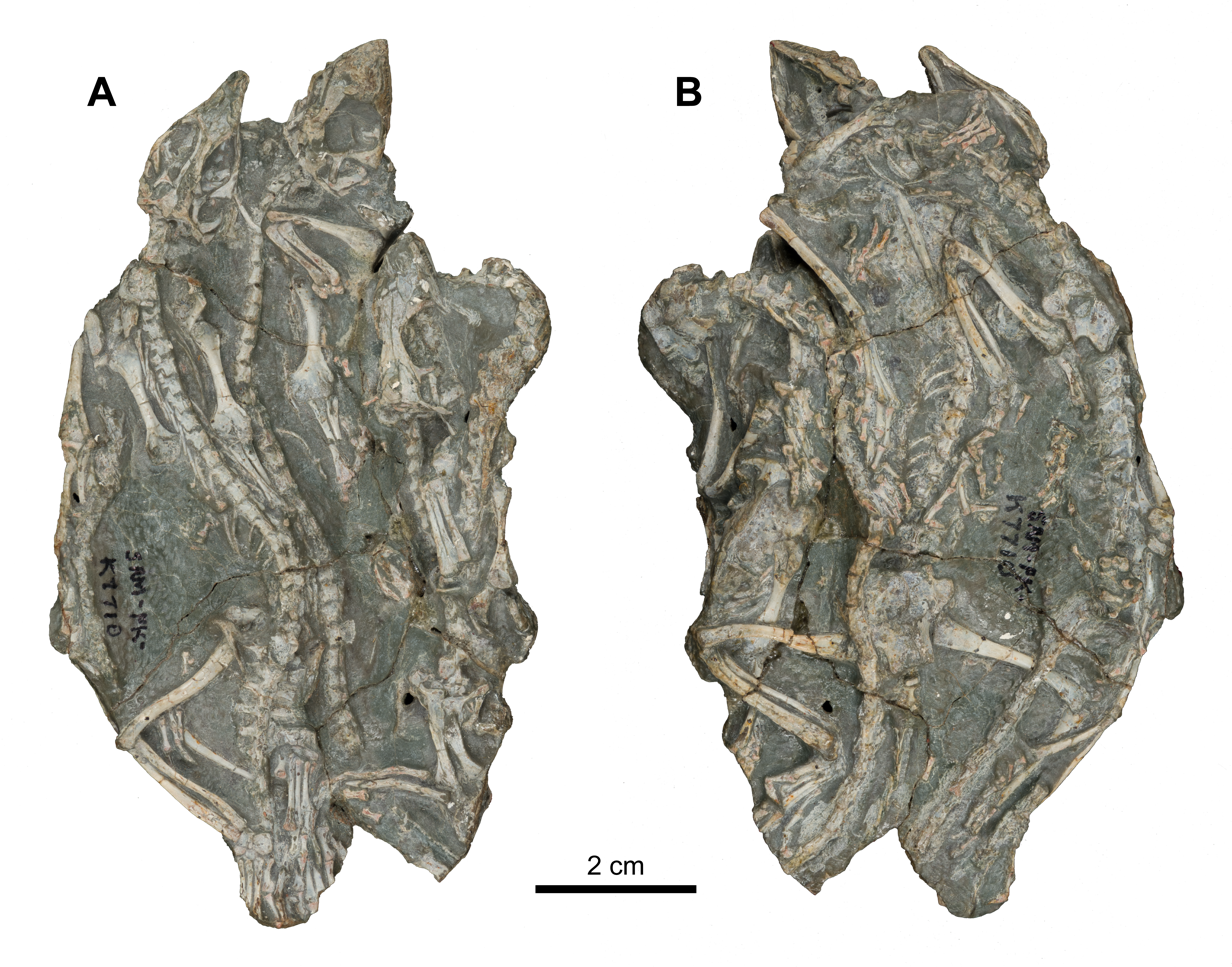
SAM-PK-K7710, including the holotype of Scyllacerta creanae

Subsequent research by Jenkins and colleagues (2025) based on synchrotron data and an expansive phylogenetic dataset supported a placement of tangasaurids (Acerosodontosaurus, Hovasaurus and Thadeosaurus) diverging after younginids (Youngina and the then-unnamed Endothiodon Assemblage Zone taxon, Scyllacerta). In their description of the EAZ taxon in 2026, Jenkins et al. used an updated version of this matrix for their phylogenetic analyses. They recovered conflicting results regarding the relationships of tangasaurids to younginids; an implied weighting parsimony analysis placed them as successive lineages (rendering 'Younginiformes' paraphyletic), while a time-calibrated Bayesian analysis recovered a monophyletic Younginiformes, with Tangasauridae as the sister group to Younginidae (including Saurosternon). Abbreviated versions of these analyses are displayed below. As explained by Buffa et al. (2025), Jenkins et al. noted that this uncertainty may be partly due to a limited knowledge about the anatomy of some members of this clade, and that future detailed studies may provide improved resolution.

Topology C: Implied weighting analysis

- Parapleurota
  - †Millerettidae
  - Neodiapsida
    - †Saurosternon
    - - †Younginidae
        - †Scyllacerta
        - - †Akkedops
          - †Youngina
      - - †Tangasauridae
          - †Acerosodontosaurus
          - - †Hovasaurus
            - †Thadeosaurus
        - - †Weigeltisauridae
          - - †Claudiosaurus
            - Reptile crown-group
              - Archosauromorpha
              - Lepidosauromorpha

Topology D: Bayesian analysis

- Parapleurota
  - †Millerettidae
  - Neodiapsida
    - †Younginiformes
      - †Younginidae
        - †Saurosternon
        - - †Scyllacerta
          - - †Akkedops
            - Youngina
      - Tangasauridae
        - †Acerosodontosaurus
        - †Hovasaurus
        - †Thadeosaurus
    - - †Weigeltisauridae
      - - †Claudiosaurus
        - Reptile crown-group
          - Archosauromorpha
          - Lepidosauromorpha
