= Tangasaurus =

Tangasaurus Temporal range: Late Permian, 252.5–251 Ma

Scientific classification
- Domain: Eukaryota
- Kingdom: Animalia
- Phylum: Chordata
- Class: Reptilia
- Clade: Neodiapsida
- Family: †Tangasauridae
- Genus: †Tangasaurus; Haughton, 1924

Type species
- †Tangasaurus mennelli Haughton, 1924

Extinct genus of reptiles

Tangasaurus is an extinct genus of aquatic basal tangasaurid neodiapsid known from the Late Permian period (late Changhsingian stage) of Tanga, northeastern Tanzania. It contains a single species, Tangasaurus mennelli.

== Etymology ==
Tangasaurus was first described and named by Sidney H. Haughton in 1924 and the type species is Tangasaurus mennelli. The generic name is derived from the name of the Tanga Region in which the only known specimens were found, and Greek sauros, meaning "lizard". The specific name honors F. P. Mennell, the geologist who reported and collected the specimens of Tangasaurus.

== Discovery ==
Tangasaurus is known only from three syntypes which represent two individuals. The small individual, which is well preserved in two specimens (part and counterpart) and is known from a partial skull and a nearly complete postcranial skeleton, was designated as the lectotype of the genus. The part slab (showing the partial skull and postcranial) is hosted at the Bulawayo Museum, Zimbabwe, while the counterpart slab SAM 6231 (showing the other side of the postcranial) is hosted at the South African Museum, Cape Town. The third syntype, SAM 6232, represents a nearly complete postcranial skeleton from a larger individual, but it is poorly preserved.

All specimens were collected by F. P. Mennell in 1922 at the Mizimbazi River near Tanga City, northeastern Tanzania. They were collected from the Ruhuhu Valley, in the middle part of the Tanga beds, dating to the late Changhsingian stage of the Lopingian series, about 252.5–251 million years ago. Although Mennell reported a presence of eight nearly complete individuals from that site, subsequent work couldn't find any evidence for the missing 6 individuals. Mennell's report, alongside some reptilian fragments that were discovered in 1913 and reported by Janensch (1927), are the only reptilian fossils currently known from the Tanga beds.

Numerous well preserved specimens from various Late Permian localities of Madagascar were initially identified as Tangasaurus by Piveteau (1926). During that time the Mozambique Channel had just started to open. However, a reexamination of these specimens by Carroll (1981) and Currie (1982) has shown that they represent a different genus, Thadeosaurus, known only from Madagascar. Another specimen from Madagascar, MNHN 1908-32-57, was also tentatively referred to Tangasaurus. However, Currie (1980) found it to represent a new and distinct genus which he named Acerosodontosaurus.

== Description ==
Tangasaurus was described and named by Sidney H. Haughton in 1924 who found it to be a probable diapsid reptile that, because of the long, powerful, flattened tail, had become adapted for an aquatic existence. Contrary to Haughton, Piveteau (1926) considered Tangasaurus to be a primarily terrestrial animal. Following Nopcsa (1924), he considered it to be related to the Araeoscelis, Kadaliosaurus, Broomia and the "eosuchians" (a defunct clade that used to unite all diapsids more advanced than Araeoscelis) Saurosternon and Pleurosaurus. Described by Piveteau (1926), Hovasaurus boulei from Madagascar was considered to be related to Mesosaurus. Although not as specialized as Mesosaurus for living in the water, Piveteau noted its short neck, short manus, well developed haemal spines and slight pachyostosis of the ribs. Haughton (1930) restudied Piveteau's specimens from Madagascar, concluding that Tangasaurus (then included the Malagasy specimens) and Hovasaurus were allied and that both were diapsids. Tangasaurus was considered to be morphologically intermediate between Youngina and Hovasaurus which was recognized as an aquatic reptile due to its short forelimb and coracoid, small ossification and elongated body. Piveteau (1926) included Broomia, Saurosternon and Tangasaurus in the Tangasaurinae. After Haughton's paper (1930), Tangasaurus and Hovasaurus were usually included as the only representatives of the family Tangasauridae. The known specimens of Tangasaurus were redescribed by Philip J. Currie (1982). He diagnosed the genus on the basis of two autapomorphies: It possesses high and rectangular neural spines of the dorsal vertebrae and the height of neural spine of mid-caudal vertebra about 35% greater than length of associated centrum, and about 75% length of associated haemal arch and spine. The largest "tangasaurid" (sensu Currie, 1982) is Hovasaurus with an estimated maximum snout-vent length of about 30 cm (12 in). The largest specimen of Tangasaurus is 20% smaller than that, but its incomplete ossification suggests that larger specimens probably existed. Currie (1982) united to subfamilies within the Tangasauridae: Kenyasaurinae (that he named to include Kenyasaurus and Thadeosaurus) and Tangasaurinae (to include Tangasauridae sensu Haughton, 1930). He allied Tangasauridae and Youngina together within superfamily Younginoidea which he named. Currie (1980) named Acerosodontosaurus, and allied it with Younginoidea in the clade Younginiformes. More recent works that use phylogenetic analyses usually suggest that neither Younginoidea nor Younginiformes are monophyletic. Constanze Bickelmann, Johannes Müller and Robert R. Reisz (2009) redescribed Acerosodontosaurus and suggested an aquatic lifestyle for it. Their analysis is figured below, and it found support for two distinct families within "Younginiformes": the aquatic Tangasauridae, and the terrestrial Younginidae (in partial polytomy with Tangasauridae).

- Diapsida
  - Araeoscelidia
  - Neodiapsida
    - Lanthanolania
    - Kenyasaurus
    - - Tangasauridae
        - Tangasaurus
        - - Acerosodontosaurus
          - Hovasaurus
      - Youngina
      - - Galesphyrus
        - Thadeosaurus
    - - Claudiosaurus
      - - - Palaeagama
          - Saurosternon
        - - Coelurosauravus
          - Sauria

More resolved results were obtained by Robert R. Reisz, Sean P. Modesto and Diane M. Scott (2011) in their description of Orovenator. However, those results required the exclusion of the fragmentary taxa Galesphyrus, Kenyasaurus, Palaeagama and Saurosternon from their analysis. The cladogram below shows Tangasaurus phylogenetic position among other neodiapsids following Reisz et al., 2011.

- Diapsida
  - Araeoscelidia
  - Neodiapsida
    - Orovenator
    - - Lanthanolania
      - - Tangasauridae
          - Tangasaurus
          - - Acerosodontosaurus
            - Hovasaurus
        - - Younginidae
            - Thadeosaurus
            - Youngina
          - - Claudiosaurus
            - Sauria
