= Lower Sakamena Formation =

Geological formation in Madagascar

- Stratigraphic range: Lopingian; ~259–252 Ma
- Type: Geological formation
- Unit of: Sakamena Group
- Underlies: Middle Sakamena Formation
- Overlies: Sakoa Formation

Lithology
- Other: Sandstone, conglomerate, Mudstone

Location
- Coordinates: 22.5476111°S 45.423666°E
- Country: Madagascar
- Extent: Morondava Basin
- Lower Sakamena Formation (Madagascar)

The Lower Sakamena Formation is a geological formation found in the Morondava Basin on the southern part of the island of Madagascar. It is widely regarded as dating to the Late Permian period, around 259-252 million years ago. It is well known for largely complete, articulated fossils of fish and reptiles that are found in concretions, along with more fragmentary therapsid and amphibian remains.

== Geology and setting ==
The Lower Sakamena Formation is generally thought to be Late Permian in age. The formation forms the lowest part of the 4000 m thick Sakamena Group (which is sometimes considered part of the Karoo Supergroup) within the Morondava Basin of southern Madagascar, of consists of predominantly coarse fluvial and lacustrine derived sediments, including sandstone and conglomerate as well as mudstone, deposited within a rift valley system with rift lakes. Articulated remains of vertebrates (which are sometimes preserved as moulds) are primarily found in concretions concentrated within certain horizons, though disarticulated vertebrate remains are also sometimes found separately from concretions.

== Paleoenvironment ==
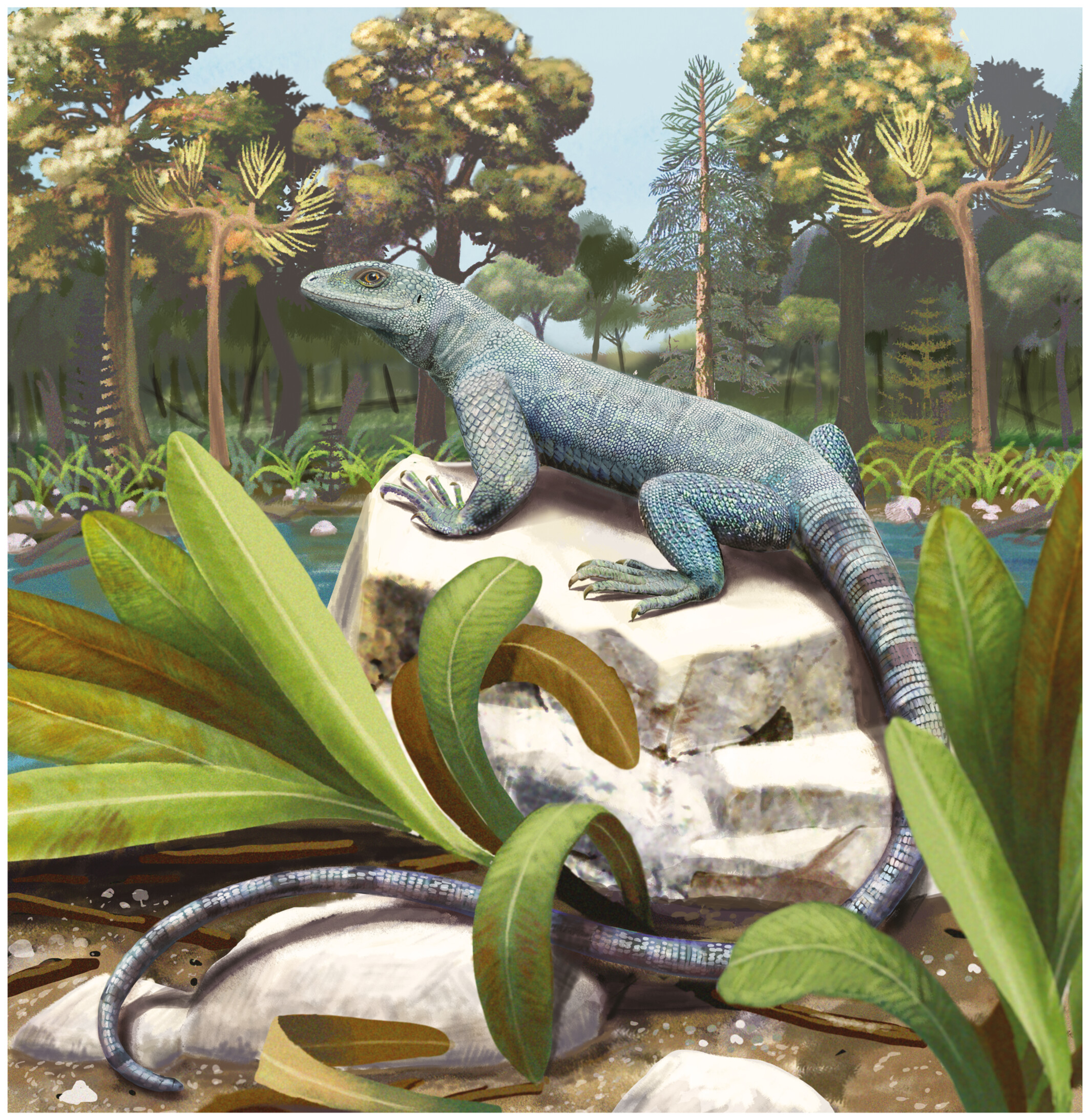
Life restoration of Thadeosaurus in the lakeshore environment of the Lower Sakamena Formation, with Glossopteris leaves in the foreground

The environment of the formation is thought to have been warm and humid with a temperate climate, with rainfall likely being seasonal and possibly monsoonal, with the immediate area surrounding the lakes likely being a riparian forest in which Glossopteris trees were likely a prominent component. The lower waters of the lakes within the rift system are likely to have been cold and anoxic (oxygen depleted), which helped to preserve animal remains by slowing decay. The articulated animal remains are suggested to largely have originated from mass mortality events when during heavily rain and floods, the anoxic waters in the lower part of the lakes became mixed with those in the upper part, killing aquatic animals as a result of oxygen deprivation in the case of fish or thermal shock. Articulated remains of terrestrial vertebrates were probably were washed in postmortem rather than being killed by the anoxic water.

== Paleobiota ==
After Smith (2000):

=== Vertebrates ===
Vertebrates of the Lower Sakamena Formation
Genus	Note	Images
Claudiosaurus	A probably aquatic neodiapsid reptile	
Hovasaurus	An aquatic tangasaurid neodiapsid reptile	
Barasaurus	An owenettid procolophonian non-diapsid reptile	
Coelurosauravus	A gliding weigeltisaurid neodiapsid reptile	
Thadeosaurus	A probably terrestrial tangasaurid neodiapsid reptile	
Acerosodontosaurus	A probably aquatic tangasaurid neodiapsid reptile	
Oudenodon	A dicynodont therapsid known from a skull. Other indeterminate postcranial dicynodont remains are also known from the formation	Skull of the related Oudenodon latirostris
Atherstonia	A "palaeoniscoid"-grade ray-finned fish	
Rhinesuchidae indet	Temnospondyl amphibians known from fragmentary remains	Life restoration of the related rhinesuchid Rhinesuchus
Theriodontia indet	An indeterminate therapsid known from a lower jaw	

=== Flora ===
Flora of the Lower Sakamena Formation
Genus	Note	Images
Glossopteris	A glossopterid seed-bearing tree known from leaves	
Lepidopteris	A peltasperm seed fern known from stems	
Schizoneura	An equisetalean related to modern horsetails known from stems	
