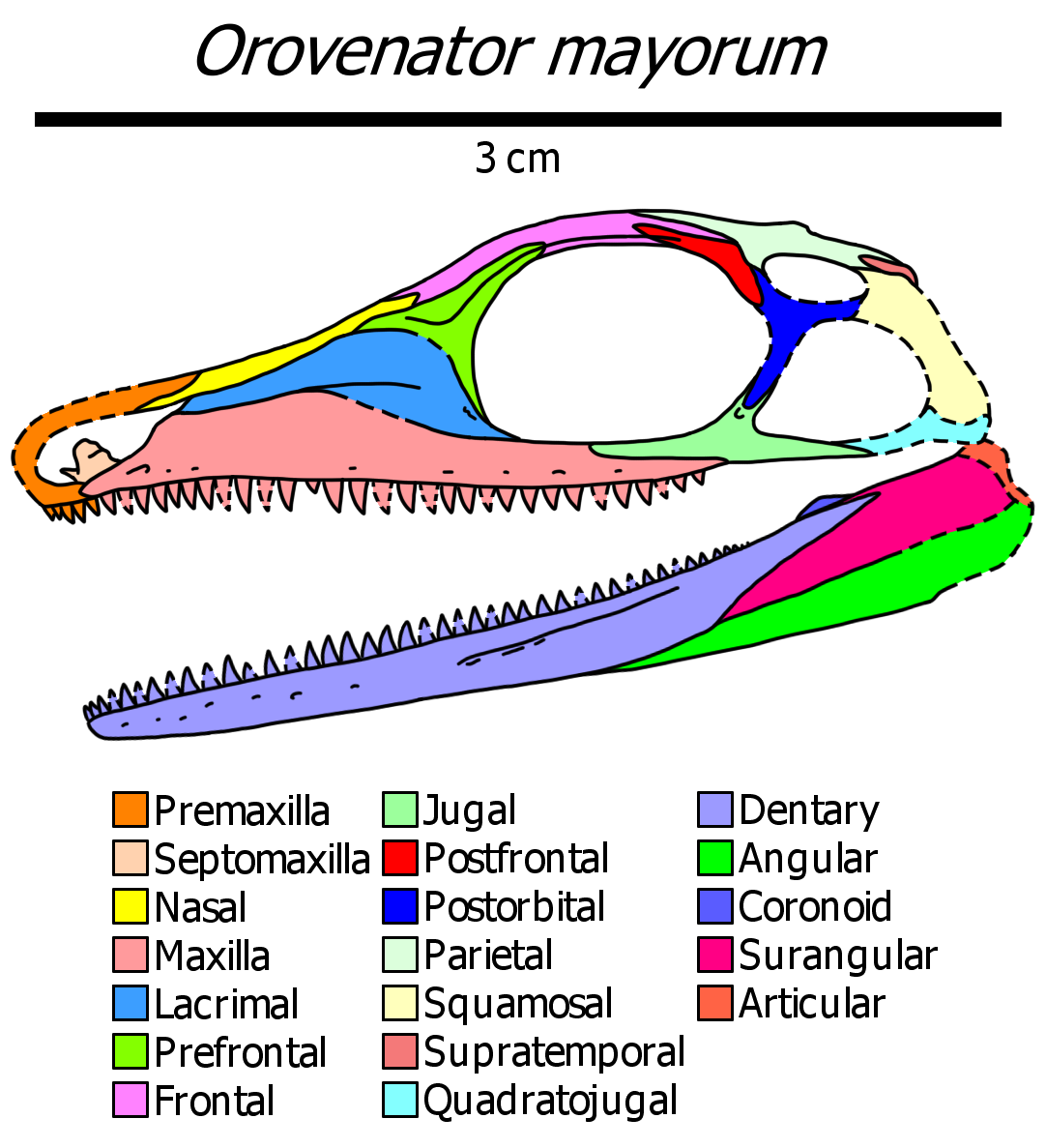
- Skull diagram

Scientific classification
- Kingdom: Animalia
- Phylum: Chordata
- Class: Reptilia
- Clade: Neoreptilia
- Genus: †Orovenator; Reisz, Modesto & Scott, 2011

Type species
- †Orovenator mayorum Reisz, Modesto & Scott, 2011

= Orovenator =

Orovenator Temporal range: Artinskian, 289 Ma

Extinct genus of tetrapods

Orovenator is an extinct genus of early neoreptilian from Lower Permian (Artinskian stage) deposits of Oklahoma, United States. The genus contains a single species, Orovenator mayorum, known from two partial skulls. Orovenator was originally interpreted as a basal neodiapsid, but later phylogenetic analyses have instead placed Orovenator among earlier-diverging stem reptiles.

== Discovery and naming ==
Orovenator is known from two partial skulls from the Richards Spur locality in Oklahoma. The holotype OMNH 74606 consists of a partial skull preserving snout and mandible, and the referred specimen, OMNH 74607, a partial skull preserving the skull roof, vertebrae and palatal elements. It was named by Robert R. Reisz, Sean P. Modesto and Diane M. Scott in 2011 as Orovenator mayorum. The generic name combines the Greek oro, meaning "mountain", in reference to the Richards Spur locality, which was mountainous during the Permian period, and the Latin venator, meaning "hunter". The specific name honours Bill and Julie May.

== Phylogeny ==
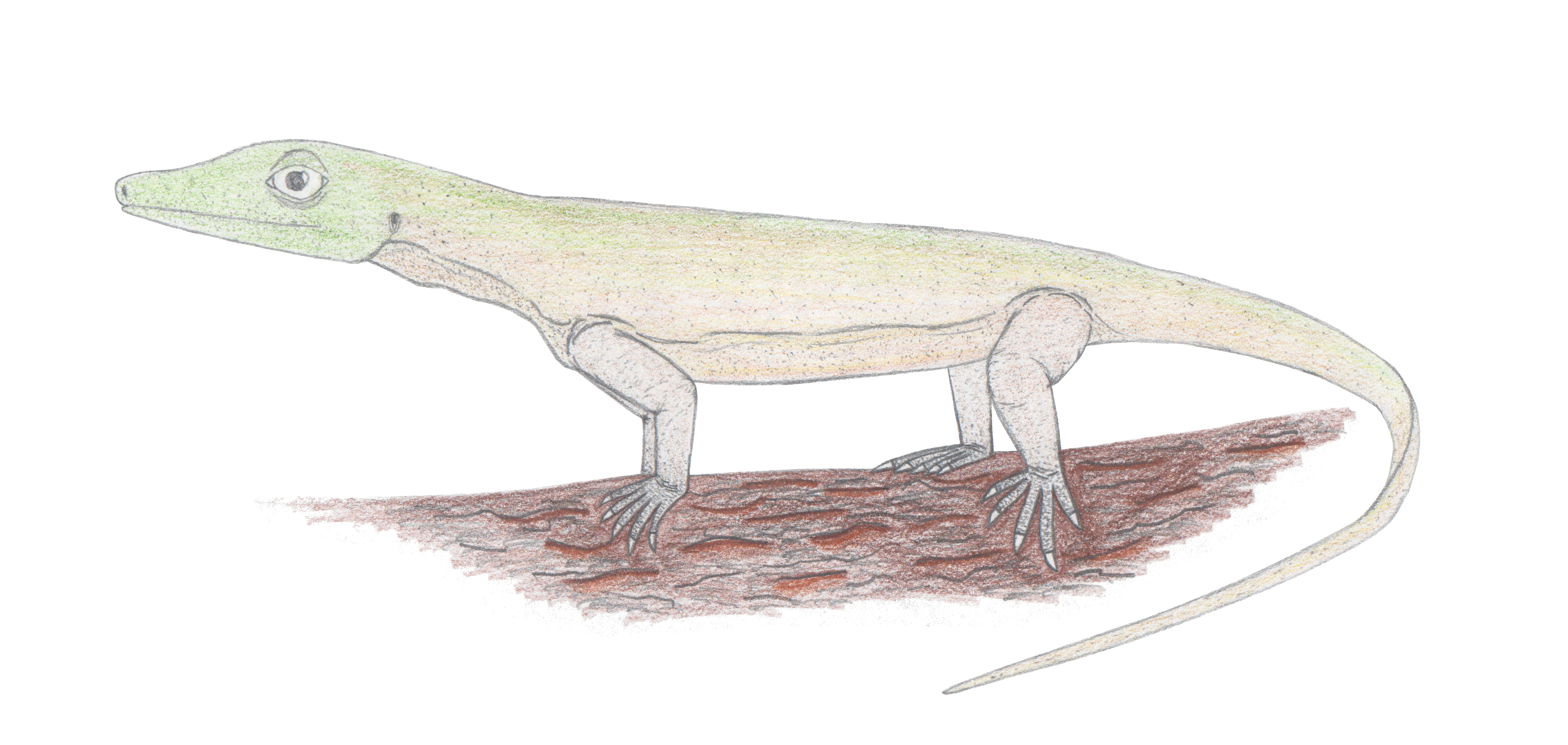
Life restoration

Cladogram after Reisz, Modesto & Scott, 2011:

- - Captorhinidae
  - Diapsida
    - Araeoscelidia
    - Neodiapsida
      - Orovenator
      - - Lanthanolania
        - - Tangasauridae
            - Tangasaurus
            - - Acerosodontosaurus
              - Hovasaurus
          - - Younginidae
              - Thadeosaurus
              - Youngina
            - - Claudiosaurus
              - Sauria
                - Archosauromorpha
                - Lepidosauromorpha

A 2018 redescription of Orovenator by David Ford and Roger Benson found that Orovenator shared many similarities with varanopids, a group of reptile-like tetrapods traditionally considered to be synapsids (amniotes more closely related to mammals than to modern reptiles). However, this proposed close relation between Orovenator and varanopids did not render Orovenator a synapsid; rather, it supported a placement for Varanopidae within Sauropsida. A varanopid position for Orovenator within Sauropsida has also been recovered by researchers in other analyses. However, a 2021 study found that the morphology of the maxillary canal of Orovenator was dissimilar to that of the varonopid Heleosaurus, which resembled that of synapsids, and instead was similar to those of other early reptiles.

In 2025, Jenkins et al. recovered Orovenator in a clade also containing Ascendonanus and Cabarzia, both of which were previously regarded as varanopid synapsids, while the true Varanopidae clade remained within Synapsida. The Orovenator clade was in turn the sister taxon to Parapleurota, which contains millerettids and neodiapsids. These results are displayed in the cladogram below:

- Sauropsida
  - †Araeoscelidia
  - - †Bolosauridae
    - Neoreptilia
      - †Ankyramorpha
        - †Acleistorhinidae
        - - †Pareiasauromorpha
          - †Procolophonoidea
      - - †Mesosauridae
        - - - †Cabarzia
            - - †Ascendonanus
              - †Orovenator
          - Parapleurota
            - †Millerettidae
            - Neodiapsida
              - †Younginidae
              - - †Tangasauridae
                - - †Weigeltisauridae
                  - - †Claudiosaurus
                    - Sauria
                      - Lepidosauromorpha
                      - Archosauromorpha
