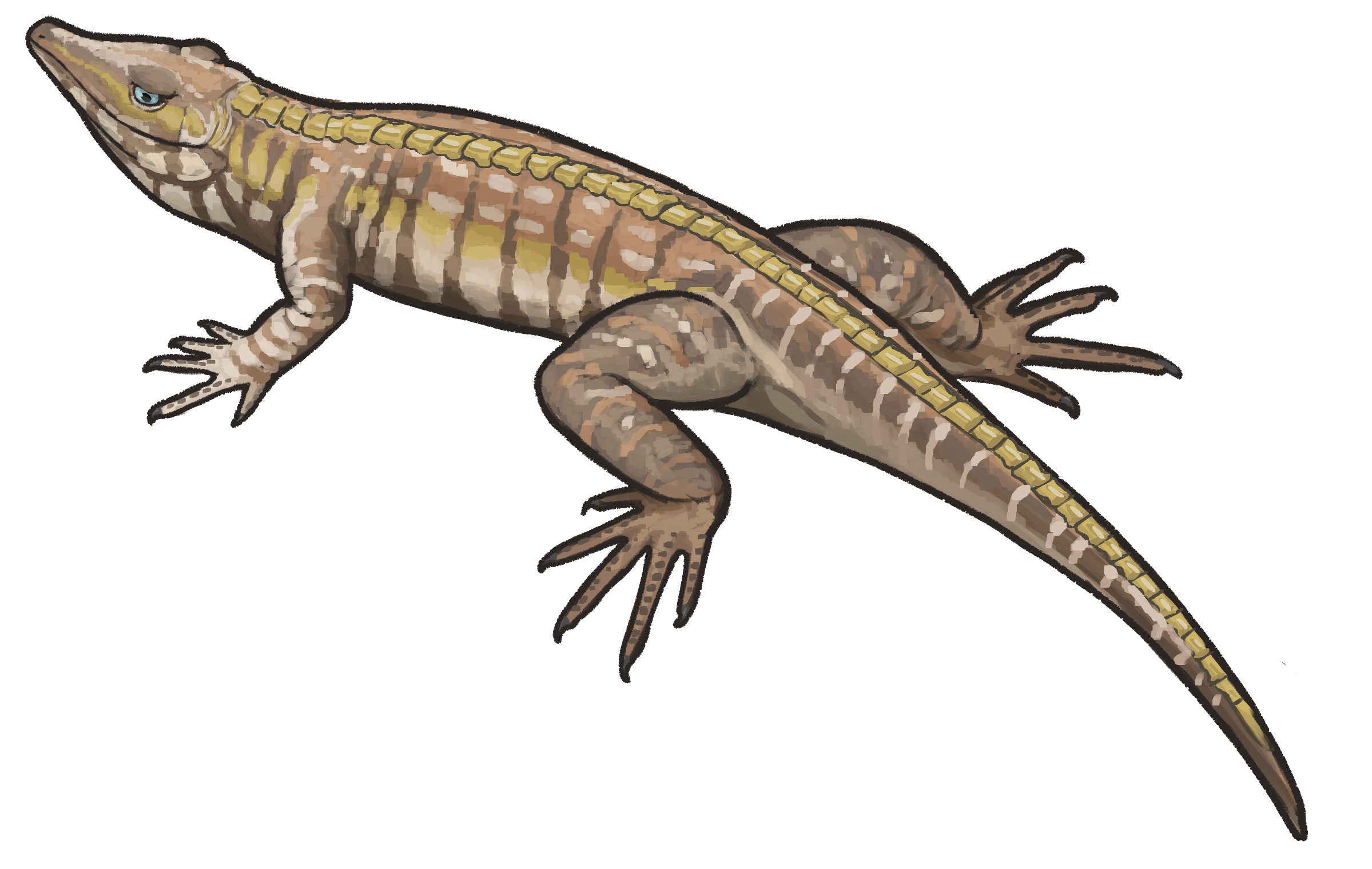
- Life restoration of Youngina

Scientific classification
- Kingdom: Animalia
- Phylum: Chordata
- Class: Reptilia
- Clade: Diapsida
- Order: †Eosuchia; Broom, 1914

= Eosuchia =

Eosuchia Temporal range: Permian-Triassic 260–205.6 Ma

Extinct order of reptiles

Eosuchia is a proposed order of extinct diapsid reptiles comprising taxa from the Permian and Triassic. Eosuchia was initially defined to include all "thecodontian" reptiles which did not have an antorbital fenestra but did retain tabulars, postparietals, and a large pineal foramen (Broom, 1914). Broom coined the term as a new suborder for Youngina.

A definition for inclusion in the order is difficult: it is almost easier to list the primitively-diapsid reptiles that have not been included at one time or another. The order has almost been treated as a dustbin for diapsids that are not obviously lepidosaurian or archosaurian. One consequence has been Romer's suggestion of the alternative order Younginiformes to be applied strictly to those forms with the primitive diapsid form, in particular, a complete lowermost arch as the quadratojugal and jugal bones of the skull meet.

The one constant eosuchian has been Youngina, a small lizard-shaped reptile from the Upper Permian of South Africa. This and a couple of other genera make up the family Younginidae.

The tangasaurids, a family that includes forms apparently adapted for swimming in fresh water, is also usually included.

In some phylogenies Eosuchia has been treated (probably erroneously) as a sister lepidosaur taxon to Squamata and Rhynchocephalia.
