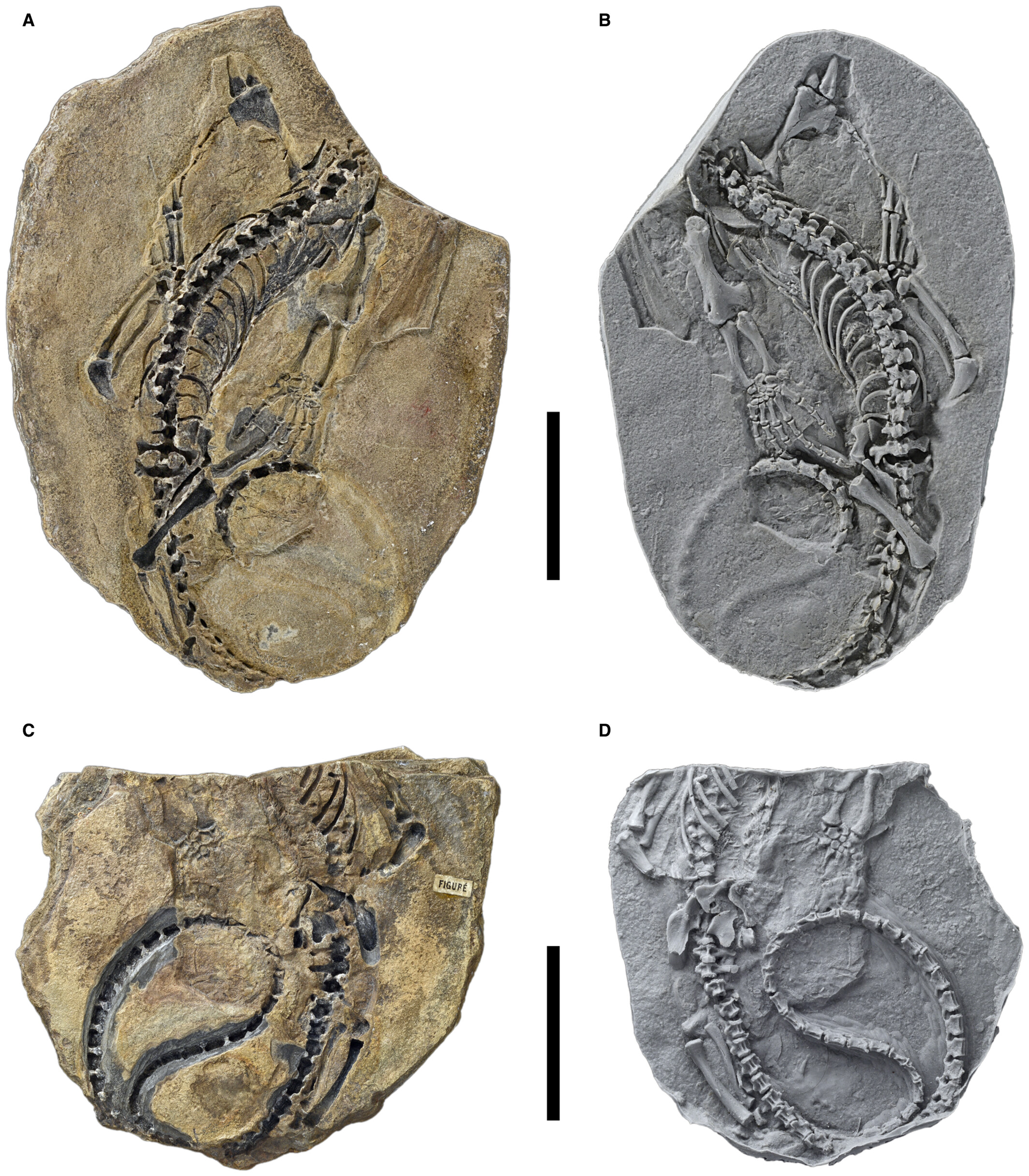
- Holotype specimen; natural mold (A, C), and silicone cast (C, D)

Scientific classification
- Kingdom: Animalia
- Phylum: Chordata
- Class: Reptilia
- Clade: Diapsida
- Clade: Neodiapsida
- Family: †Younginidae
- Genus: †Thadeosaurus; Carroll, 1981

Type species
- †Thadeosaurus colcanapi Carroll, 1981

= Thadeosaurus =

Thadeosaurus Temporal range: Late Permian, ?Capitanian–Lopingian

Extinct genus of reptiles

Thadeosaurus is an extinct genus of diapsid reptiles from the late Permian Lower Sakamena Formation (Sakamena Group) of Madagascar. The genus contains a single species, Thadeosaurus colcanapi, known from several specimens preserved as natural molds.

== Discovery and naming ==
The generic name, Thadeosaurus, is an anagram of "Datheosaurus", a synapsid genus to which fossils of the former were initially referred. The specific name, colcanapi, honors J.-M. Colcanap, a French infantry captain and the discoverer of the holotype specimen.

== Description ==
Size compared to a human hand

Thadeosaurus was a superficially lizard-like reptile, with a remarkably long tail that comprised about two-thirds of the animal's total length of 60 centimetres (24 in). It had long toes, especially on the hind legs, and a strong breast bone.

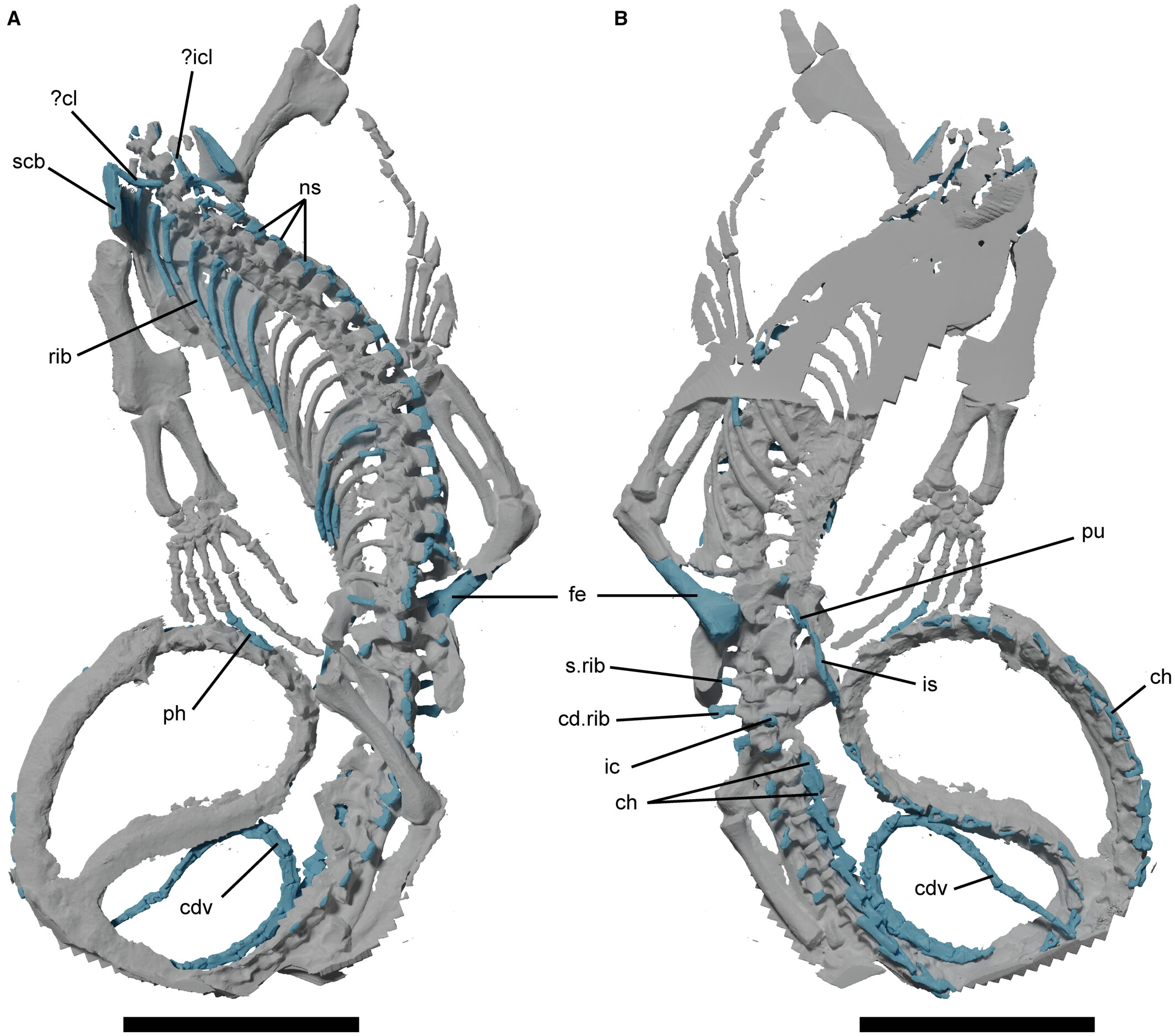
Surface model of the T. colcanapi holotype, with details not visible in the natural mold and silicone cast shown in blue

== Classification ==
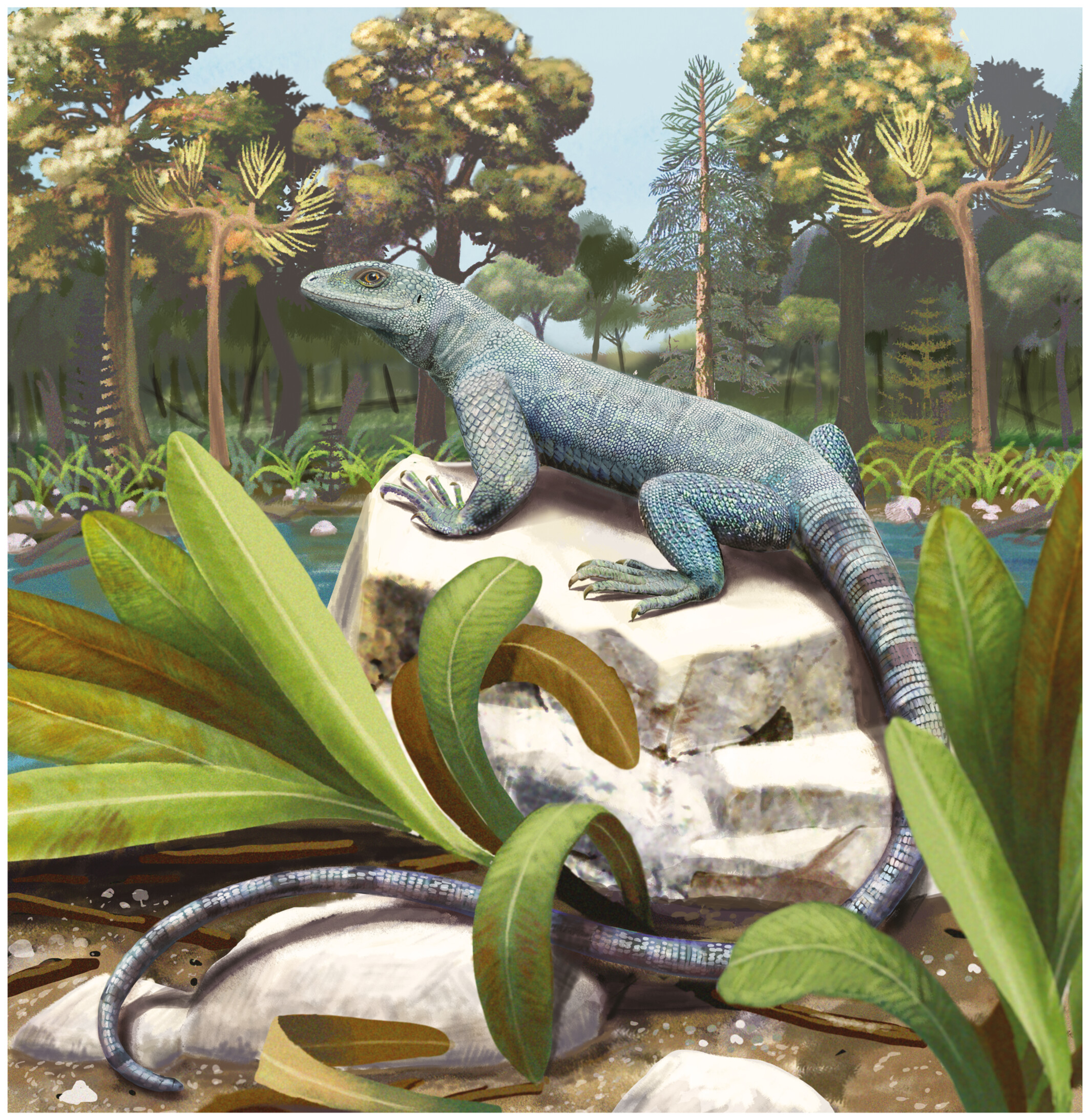
Speculative life restoration

The relationships of Thadeosaurus have been debated since its 1981 description. Prior to receiving a name, the fossil material was provisionally referred to Broomia (now recognized as a millerettid), Tangasaurus, and Datheosaurus (now recognized as a caseid synapsid). In his 1981 publication naming Thadeosaurus and Claudiosaurus, Carroll noted similarities between Thadeosaurus and Youngina, but opted to describe it as a 'primitive' sauropterygian—an 'ancestral taxon' to nothosaurs and plesiosaurs.

In the description of the early Permian reptile Orovenator, the phylogenetic results of Reisz et al. (2011) suggested a close relationship between Thadeosaurus and Youngina, united in the family Younginidae. These results are displayed in the cladogram below:

- - Captorhinidae
  - Diapsida
    - Araeoscelidia
    - Neodiapsida
      - Orovenator
      - - Lanthanolania
        - - Tangasauridae
            - Tangasaurus
            - - Acerosodontosaurus
              - Hovasaurus
          - - Younginidae
              - Thadeosaurus
              - Youngina
            - - Claudiosaurus
              - Sauria
                - Archosauromorpha
                - Lepidosauromorpha

In 2025, Valentin Buffa and colleagues thoroughly redescribed the fossil material assigned to Thadeosaurus, and reassessed its phylogenetic position. They identified it as a member of the neodiapsid family Tangasauridae, as the sister taxon to the clade formed by Hovasaurus and Tangasaurus, a position also supported by Philip J. Currie in a publication redescribing Tangasaurus. The results of the strict consensus phylogenetic results of Buffa et al. (2025) are displayed in the cladogram below:

- Diapsida
  - Araeoscelidia
  - - Varanopidae
    - Neoreptilia
      - Parareptilia
      - Neodiapsida
        - Youngina
        - - Tangasauridae
            - Kenyasaurus
            - - Acerosodontosaurus
              - - Thadeosaurus
                - Tangasaurinae
                  - Hovasaurus
                  - Tangasaurus
          - - - Claudiosaurus
              - Weigeltisauridae
                - Weigeltisaurus
                - Coelurosauravus
                - Rautiania spp.
            - Sauria
              - - Paliguana
                - Lepidosauria
              - - Archosauromorpha
