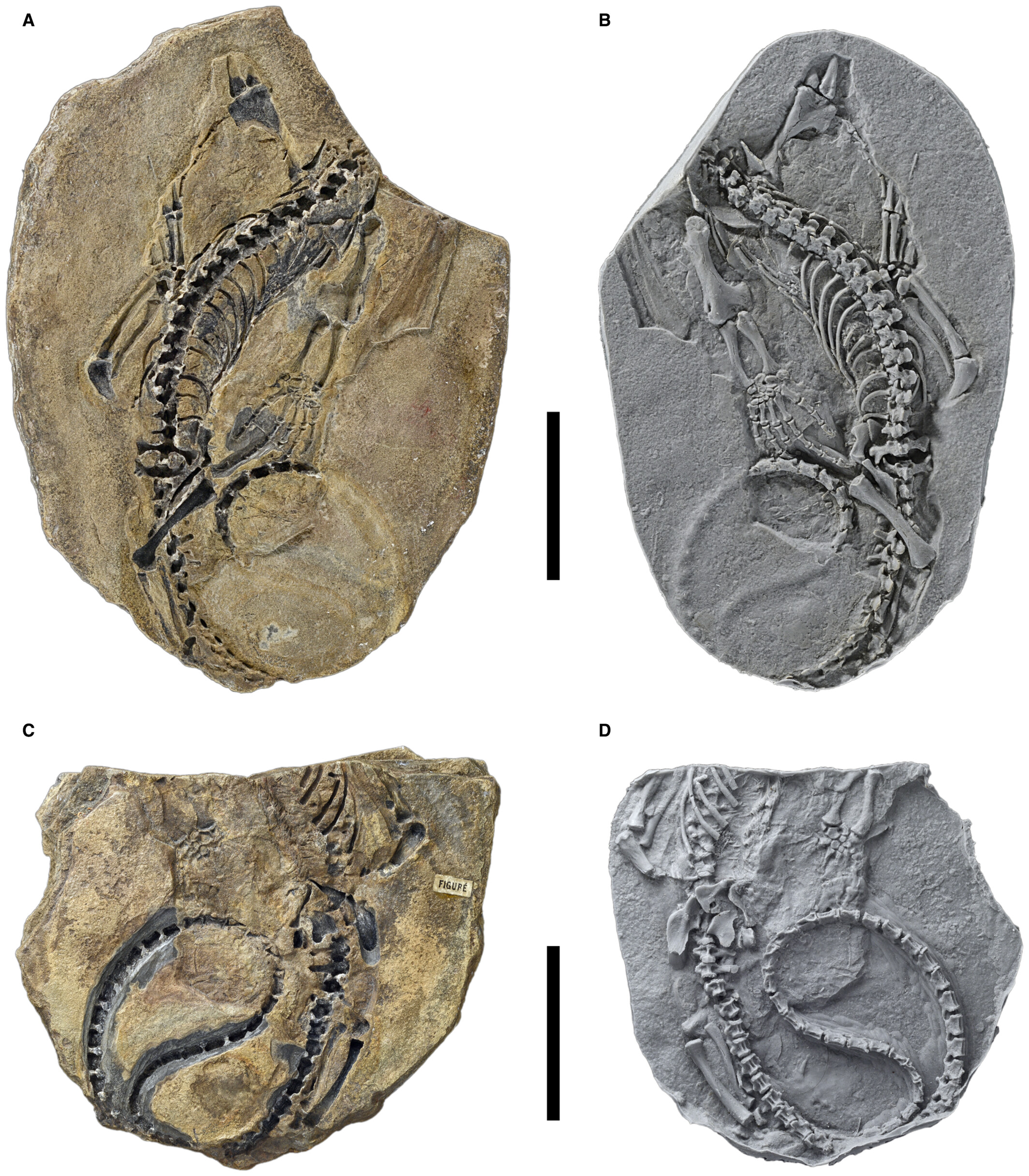
- Holotype of Thadeosaurus colcanapi

Scientific classification
- Kingdom: Animalia
- Phylum: Chordata
- Class: Reptilia
- Clade: Neodiapsida
- Family: †Tangasauridae; Piveteau, 1926

Subgroups
- †Acerosodontosaurus; †Kenyasaurus; †Thadeosaurus; †Tangasaurinae; †Hovasaurus; †Tangasaurus

= Tangasauridae =

Tangasauridae Temporal range: Late Permian-Early Triassic, 260–247 Ma

Extinct family of reptiles

Tangasauridae is an extinct family of diapsids known from fossils found in Late Permian to Early Triassic rocks in Madagascar, Kenya and Tanzania. Fossils have been found of members of this family in different stages of ontogenic development. Material from the early Triassic Middle Sakamena Formation of the Morondava Basin of Madagascar indicates that the Tangasauridae survived the Permian-Triassic extinction event.

== Description and phylogeny ==
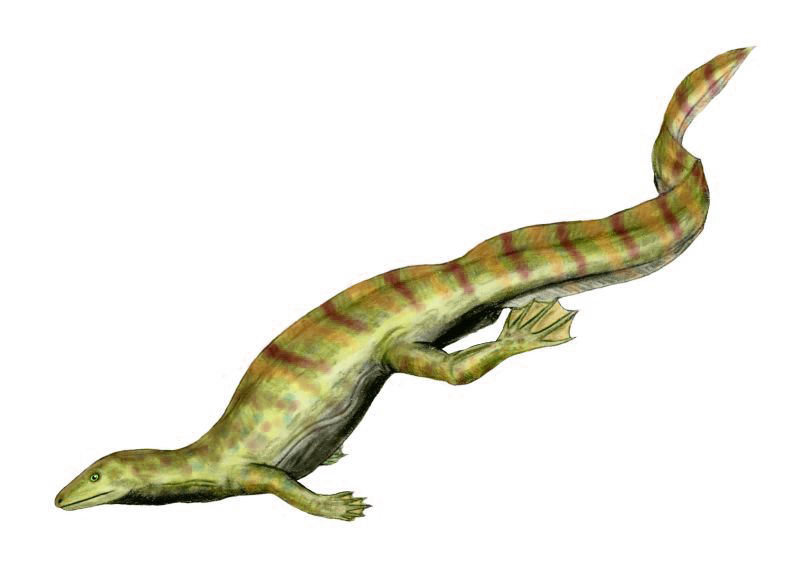
Speculative life restoration of Hovasaurus

Tangasaurids are known to have been a highly derived group of diapsids. Kenyasaurus and Thadeosaurus, sometimes placed in a distinct subfamily 'Kenyasaurinae', were likely fully terrestrial. They had long toes and highly developed sterna that made them well-suited to life on land. In comparison, Hovasaurus and Tangasaurus (placed in the subfamily Tangasaurinae), were adapted to a more aquatic life. They laterally compressed tails and likely webbed feet that allowed them to swim in the freshwater lacustrine environment present at the time. Because of their highly derived aquatic characteristics and occurrence in time, it has historically been suggested that the tangasaurids were a direct ancestor of the superorder Sauropterygia, which includes many highly derived marine aquatic reptiles such as placodonts, nothosaurs, and plesiosaurs.

=== Classification ===
Despite the controversy over the definition of the order Eosuchia (a clade to which the Tangasauridae has been considered to belong) and as to which taxa should be considered to fall within it, the position of the tangasaurids as part of this group has rarely been questioned. An alternative order has been proposed to resolve the issues surrounding Eosuchia, the Younginiformes. Because their quadratojugal and jugal bones meet to form an arch in the skull, as is a characteristic of many primitive diapsids, tangasaurids would be included in Younginiformes. However, this classification scheme is dependent on the Younginidae forming a monophyletic clade with the Tangasauridae, which is often not recovered in phylogenetic analyses.

In 2025, Valentin Buffa and colleagues thoroughly redescribed the fossil material assigned to Thadeosaurus, and reassessed its phylogenetic position. They identified it as a member of the Tangasauridae within Neodiapsida, as the sister taxon to the clade formed by Hovasaurus and Tangasaurus (Tangasaurinae), a position also supported by Philip J. Currie in a publication redescribing Tangasaurus. The results of the strict consensus phylogenetic results of Buffa et al. (2025) are displayed in the cladogram below:

- Diapsida
  - Araeoscelidia
  - - Varanopidae
    - Neoreptilia
      - Parareptilia
      - Neodiapsida
        - Youngina
        - - Tangasauridae
            - Kenyasaurus
            - - Acerosodontosaurus
              - - Thadeosaurus
                - Tangasaurinae
                  - Hovasaurus
                  - Tangasaurus
          - - - Claudiosaurus
              - Weigeltisauridae
                ⊞
                - Weigeltisaurus
                - Coelurosauravus
                - Rautiania spp.
                ⊟
            - Sauria
              - - Paliguana
                - Lepidosauria
              - - Archosauromorpha
