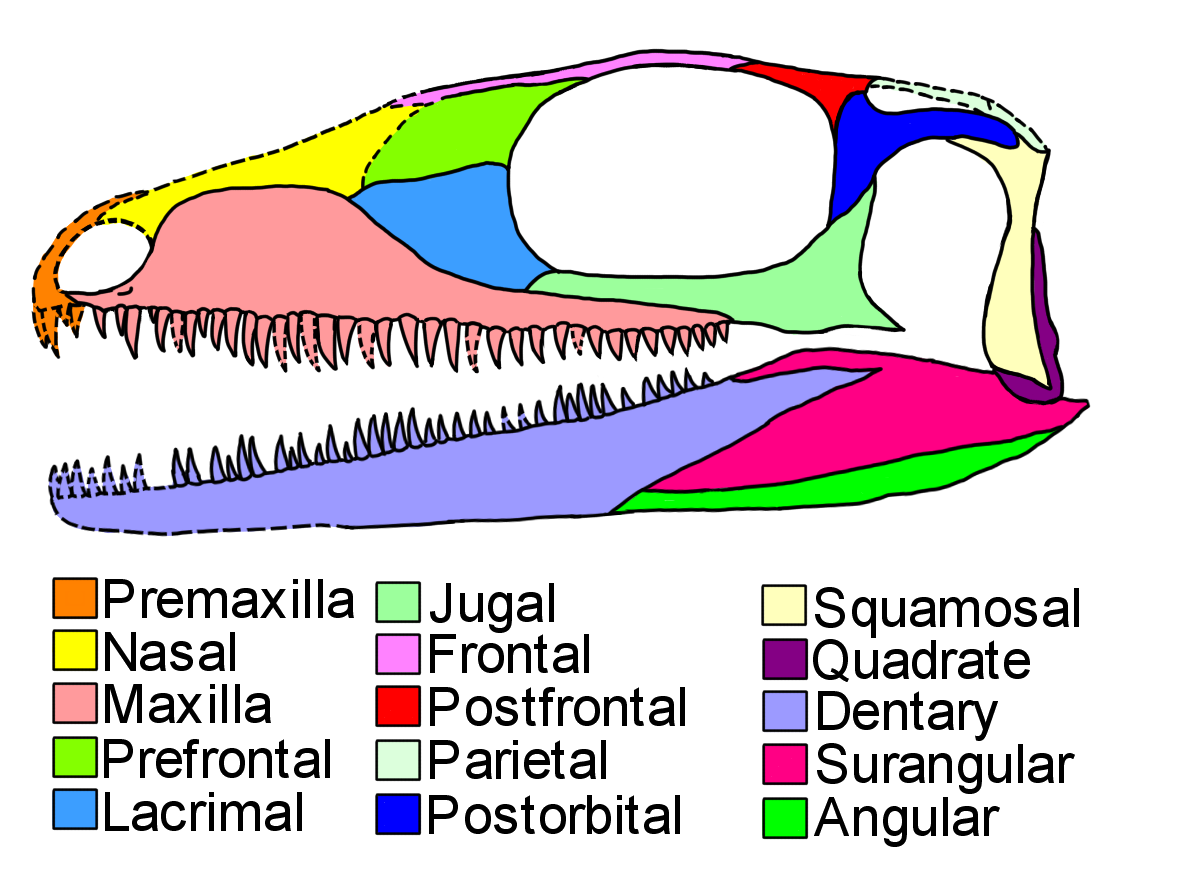
- Skull diagram

Scientific classification
- Kingdom: Animalia
- Phylum: Chordata
- Class: Reptilia
- Family: †Tangasauridae
- Genus: †Acerosodontosaurus; Currie 1980

Type species
- †Acerosodontosaurus piveteaui Currie 1980

= Acerosodontosaurus =

Acerosodontosaurus Temporal range: Late Permian, 260–252 Ma

Extinct genus of reptiles

Acerosodontosaurus is an extinct genus of neodiapsid reptiles that lived during the Late Permian of Madagascar. The only species of Acerosodontosaurus, A. piveteaui, is known from a natural mold of a single partial skeleton including a crushed skull and part of the body and limbs. The fossil was discovered in deposits of the Lower Sakamena Formation. Based on skeletal characteristics, it has been suggested that Acerosodontosaurus individuals were at least partially aquatic.

Acerosodontosaurus has generally been considered a "younginiform", part of a paraphyletic grade of Permian diapsids which linked the most basal ("primitive") diapsids (araeoscelidians such as Petrolacosaurus) to more derived ("advanced") diapsids, including the earliest ancestors of modern reptiles such as crocodilians and lizards (Sauria). However, its position within the grade is controversial. Initially considered a specimen of the contemporaneous Tangasaurus, Acerosodontosaurus was later described as a younginid in 1980 and a tangasaurid in 2009. More recent studies have even supported the hypothesis that it was not a "younginiform" at all, but rather that it was an early member of Pantestudines, the reptile lineage that would lead to modern turtles. However, this theory is still controversial, and other studies have continued to support the "younginiform" interpretation.

== History ==
Acerosodontosaurus is known from a single specimen stored at the Museum National d'Histoire Naturalle in Paris, France. This specimen, MNHN 1908-32-57, was referred to Tangasaurus and stayed undescribed until Phillip J. Currie recognized it as a new genus. He described it as Acerosodontosaurus piveteaui in 1980, a name which roughly translates to "Piveteau's needle-toothed lizard". The specific name references Jean Piveteau, a paleontologist who pioneered the study of Permian reptiles of Madagascar.

The specimen was extracted from an unknown locality in the Lower Sakamena Formation, an Upper Permian geological formation in Madagascar. The Sakamena Formation was formed by coastal rift valleys, and can be characterized by a diverse assortment of aquatic, semiaquatic, and terrestrial animals, including many early diapsids. The Acerosodontosaurus specimen is a partial skeleton preserved as a compression fossil within a sandstone nodule. The skeleton is mostly but not entirely articulated, preserving most of the trunk, right forelimb, and small portions of the left forelimb and hindlimbs. Bones on the left side of the skull were displaced as the animal decayed, but the majority of the right side was able to fossilize.

Most of the actual fossilized bones had been eroded away once the specimen was found, although well-preserved molds were left behind in the sandstone. Currie's description was based on latex casts made from the molds. During a 2009 redescription by Constanze Bickelmann, Johannes Mueller, & Robert R. Reisz, new high-fidelity latex molds were created using improved techniques.

== Description ==
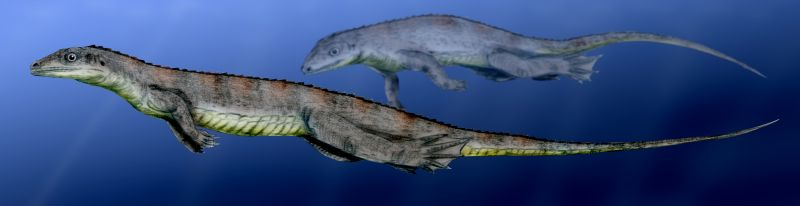
Life restoration by Nobu Tamura

The preserved skeleton was about 30 centimeters (12 inches) in length from the tip of the snout to the base of the tail. The tail is unknown, but Currie (1980) estimated that the total length of the animal from snout to tail tip would have been 60 to 70 centimeters (24 to 28 inches). The body was wide and the limbs were of medium length. The overall impression was that of a medium-sized lizard, although Acerosodontosaurus is completely unrelated to true modern lizards. Although the tail is unknown, it could have had a fin-like structure similar to that of Hovasaurus, which has been considered a close relative of Acerosodontosaurus.

=== Skull ===
The tip and upper side of the snout were not preserved, but most of the other skull bones are known. The orbits (eye holes) were large, and the skull was longer in front of the eyes than behind them. The lower edge of each orbit was formed by a long forward branch of the jugal bone, which overlies an equally elongated rear branch of the tooth-bearing maxillary bone. The skull was somewhat broader than that of most other "younginiforms", as indicated by the width and curvature of the frontal and prefrontal bones. Nevertheless, it was proportionally similar to that of Hovasaurus. The skull had an estimated total length of 55 millimeters (2.2 inches).

The mandible (lower jaw) was long and slender. The rear part of the mandible, which was formed by the articular bone, bears a facet which connects to the quadrate bone of the cranium to form the jaw joint. Both the quadrate and the corresponding facet on the mandible are very large and strongly built.

The numerous teeth of Acerosodontosaurus are conical, sharply pointed, and somewhat recurved. They are slightly longer towards the front of the skull, but otherwise are similar in size and shape throughout the skull and jaw, in contrast to the condition in earlier diapsids like Petrolacosaurus. Currie (1980) estimated that 37 teeth were present in the maxilla and 32 were in the preserved portion of the mandible, based on both preserved teeth and empty tooth sockets. Under the same criteria but using different latex casts, Bickelmann, Mueller, & Reisz (2009) estimated 36 and 34, respectively. The mandible would have had many more teeth than these estimations, since the front half of the jaw was not preserved. Acerosodontosaurus translates to "Needle-tooth lizard", referring to its high number of needle-like teeth which differ from those of other "younginiforms" in both shape and abundance.

As a diapsid, Acerosodontosaurus had two holes known as temporal fenestrae on each side of the skull, behind the eyes. However, the lower temporal fenestra was not completely enclosed from below. In most early diapsids, such as Petrolacosaurus and Youngina, the lower edge of the lower temporal fenestra is formed by a bony bar composed of the rear branch of the jugal and the forward branch of the quadratojugal bone. Yet Acerosodontosaurus has a short rear branch of the jugal, and is completely missing a quadratojugal, rendering the lower temporal fenestra incompletely enclosed. While many later diapsids also have an incomplete lower temporal fenestra, the only other "younginiform" with such a trait is Hovasaurus.

=== Vertebrae and ribs ===
At least 21 vertebrae were present, all from the neck, back, and hip; the tail is missing. The cervical (neck) vertebrae had shorter centra (main components) than the dorsal (back) vertebrae. A small pit (subcentral foramen) was present on both the left and right sides of each vertebral centrum. The neural spines (spinous processes) of the dorsal vertebrae are characteristically tall and rectangular compared to most "younginiforms", though not quite as tall as those of Hovasaurus. The centra are at their maximum length and the neural spines are at their maximum height at the vertebrae directly in front of the hip. The transverse processes (rib facets) were quite short. Although many ribs are incomplete, those that were mostly complete were long and curved, indicating that Acerosodontosaurus was a rather wide-bodied animal. As with most early diapsids, small wedge-like bones known as intercentra fill in the gaps between vertebrae. Numerous small, slender gastralia (belly ribs) were also present.

=== Forelimbs ===
The forelimbs of Acerosodontosaurus are among the most diagnostic parts of the body. The only preserved portion of the pectoral girdle is a thin, slightly curved bone with tapered tips. This is likely a cleithrum, a bone which is absent in practically all diapsids. The only other neodiapsid known with certainty to retain a cleithrum is Hovasaurus.

The humerus (forearm bone) is incomplete, but the entepicondyle and its corresponding foramen are rather well-developed. The capitulum and trochlea, on the other hand, are poorly differentiated. The radius is twisted and curved, unusually similar to that of the choristodere Champsosaurus. The ulna is hourglass-shaped, straighter and characteristically slightly longer than the radius. Unlike in terrestrial diapsids, the olecranon process of the ulna was absent. Both the radius and ulna were flatter near the wrist and more blocky near the elbow.

As with other early diapsids, Acerosodontosaurus had 11 carpal (wrist) bones. All of the carpals are well-separated. Most are similar in size and shape to those of Hovasaurus, with the exception of the medial centrale, a bone between the radiale and distal carpal I which is much smaller in Acerosodontosaurus. The first metacarpal (the hand bone which connects to the thumb) is small and stout, while the second, third, and fourth (which connect to the index, middle, and ring fingers) are incrementally longer. This contrasts with most other "younginiforms", in which the fourth metacarpal is significantly longer than the third. Hovasaurus is an exception, but even Acerosodontosaurus differs from that genus in that its metacarpals are not as short. The fifth metacarpal (which connects to the little finger) is as short as the first, but has a more "pinched" appearance. Some phalanges (finger bones) are obscured by the overlain skull, but those that are visible are short, with sharp and curved claws.

=== Hip and hindlimbs ===
The ilium (upper blade of the hip) is fairly similar to that of Hovasaurus and other reptiles, though seemingly slightly thicker. The pubis (forward blade of the hip) is a heavily built bone, strongly curving inwards. As a result, the hips would have been quite wide in life. The outer surface of each pubis has a large, diagonally-oriented tubercule (knob- or ridge-like growth). The plate-like ischium (rear-blade of the hip) is incomplete and was initially overlooked. The femur (thigh bone) is long, curved, and robust, while the tibia and fibula (shin bones) are only preserved near the knee so their form is difficult to determine. No foot bones are preserved.

== Classification ==
Initially considered a specimen of Tangasaurus, Currie (1980) subsequently assigned Acerosodontosaurus to the family Younginidae. The next year, his study of Hovasaurus noted that Acerosodontosaurus shared similarities with both tangasaurids and younginids, and he considered it ancestral to both families. Other studies found a similar result, placing it as the most basal member of "Younginiformes". The 2009 redescription of the genus partially deconstructed the concept of a monophyletic "Younginiformes" and assigned it to Tangasauridae. The 2011 description of the basal neodiapsid Orovenator considered tangasaurids to be stemward (further from modern reptiles) compared to younginids, while a 2016 study of archosauromorphs placed Acerosodontosaurus crownward (closer to modern reptiles) compared to Youngina.

Bever et al. (2015) analyzed Acerosodontosaurus alongside other neodiapsids via both maximum parsimony and Bayesian analyses, and cranial-only vs full body data. Their full specimen parsimony analysis found that it was a pantestudine lepidosauromorph related to sauropterygians, Eunotosaurus, Odontochelys, and Pappochelys. This result argues that Acerosodontosaurus was more closely related to turtles than to any other modern reptile, and that turtles were more closely related to lizards and kin (lepidosaurs) than to crocodilians and birds (archosaurs). Their cranial-only parsimony analysis matrix retained Acerosodontosaurus's identity as a basal pantestudine but removed Pantestudines from Sauria (the lepidosauromorph + archosauromorph clade). The link between Acerosodontosaurus and turtles was more tenuous in the Bayesian analyses, where it was placed as a neodiapsid closely related to Sauria but independent from Pantestudines.

During their redescription of Pappochelys, Schoch & Sues (2018) revised the matrix of Bever et al. (2015) but failed to resolve the relations of most reptile lineages near the base of Sauria, including Acerosodontosaurus. Li et al. (2018) described the new pantestudine Eorhynchochelys and revised Schoch & Sues (2018)'s data matrix further. They were able to find more stability, recovering Acerosodontosaurus as the sister taxon of Claudiosaurus and not closely related to Hovasaurus. Acerosodontosaurus and Claudiosaurus were still indeterminate neodiapsids if all taxa were included, but they were found to be the earliest pantestudines under a specific set of parameters which excluded 21 poorly-described taxa.

== Paleobiology ==
Several skeletal features support the hypothesis that Acerosodontosaurus was aquatic. The olecranon process of the ulna was absent (or not developed into bone), a trait in common with the aquatic nothosaurs, ichthyosaurs, and thalattosaurs, but in contrast to terrestrial reptiles such as Thadeosaurus. Moreover, the radius is twisted (similarly to that of the aquatic champsosaurs), and the wrist has a "relaxed" structure, with the carpals (wrist bones) separated by gaps rather than tightly connected.

=== Paleoenvironment ===
The Lower Sakamena Formation was deposited in a wetland environment situated within a North-South orientated rift valley, perhaps similar to Lake Tanganyika. The climate at the time of deposition was temperate, warm, and humid, with seasonal rainfall and possible monsoons. Flora from the formation includes the equisetalean Schizoneura, the glossopterid gymnosperm Glossopteris, and seed fern Lepidopteris. Other vertebrates known from the Lower Sakamena Formation include the palaeoniscoid fish Atherstonia, the procolophonid parareptile Barasaurus, the gliding reptile Coelurosauravus, the neodiapsids Hovasaurus, Claudiosaurus, Thadeosaurus fragments of rhinesuchid temnospondyls, an indeterminate theriodont therapsid and the dicynodont Oudenodon.
