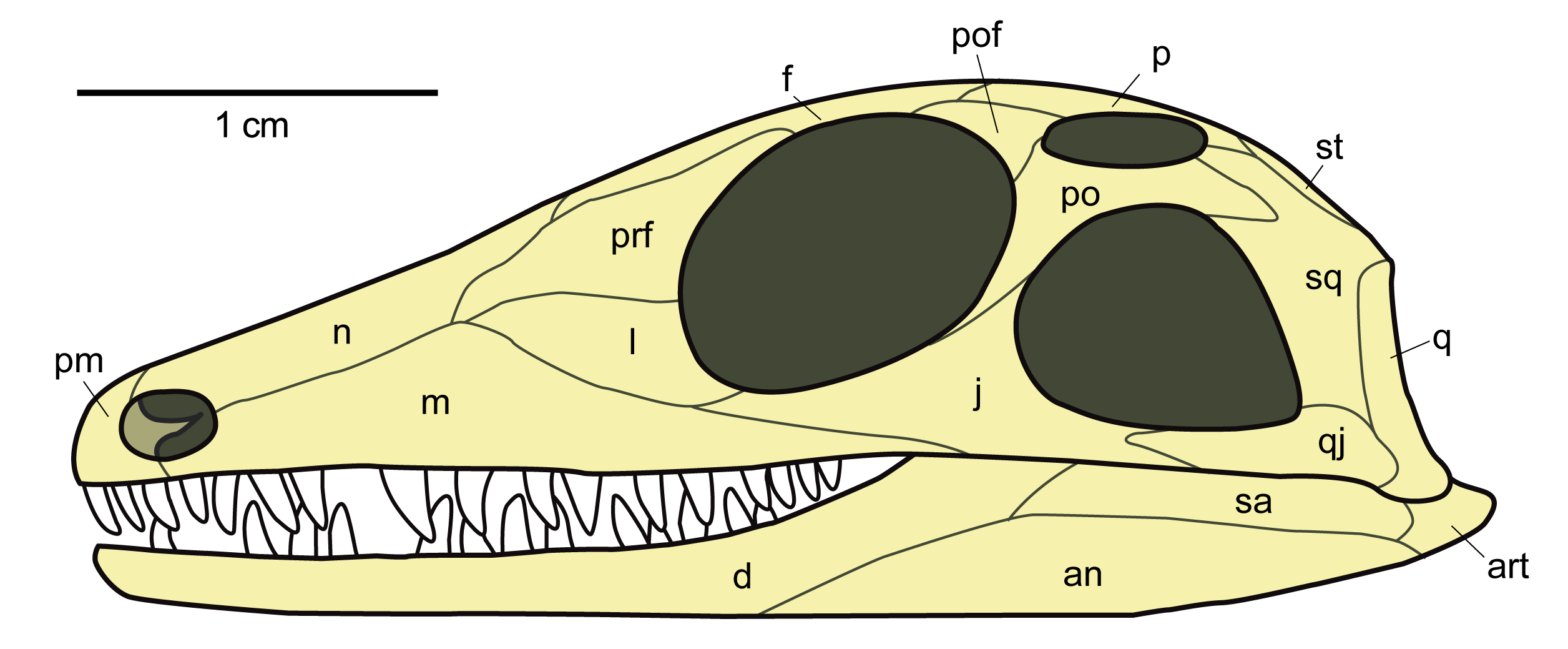
- Reconstructed skull of Youngina (a basal member of Neodiapsida)
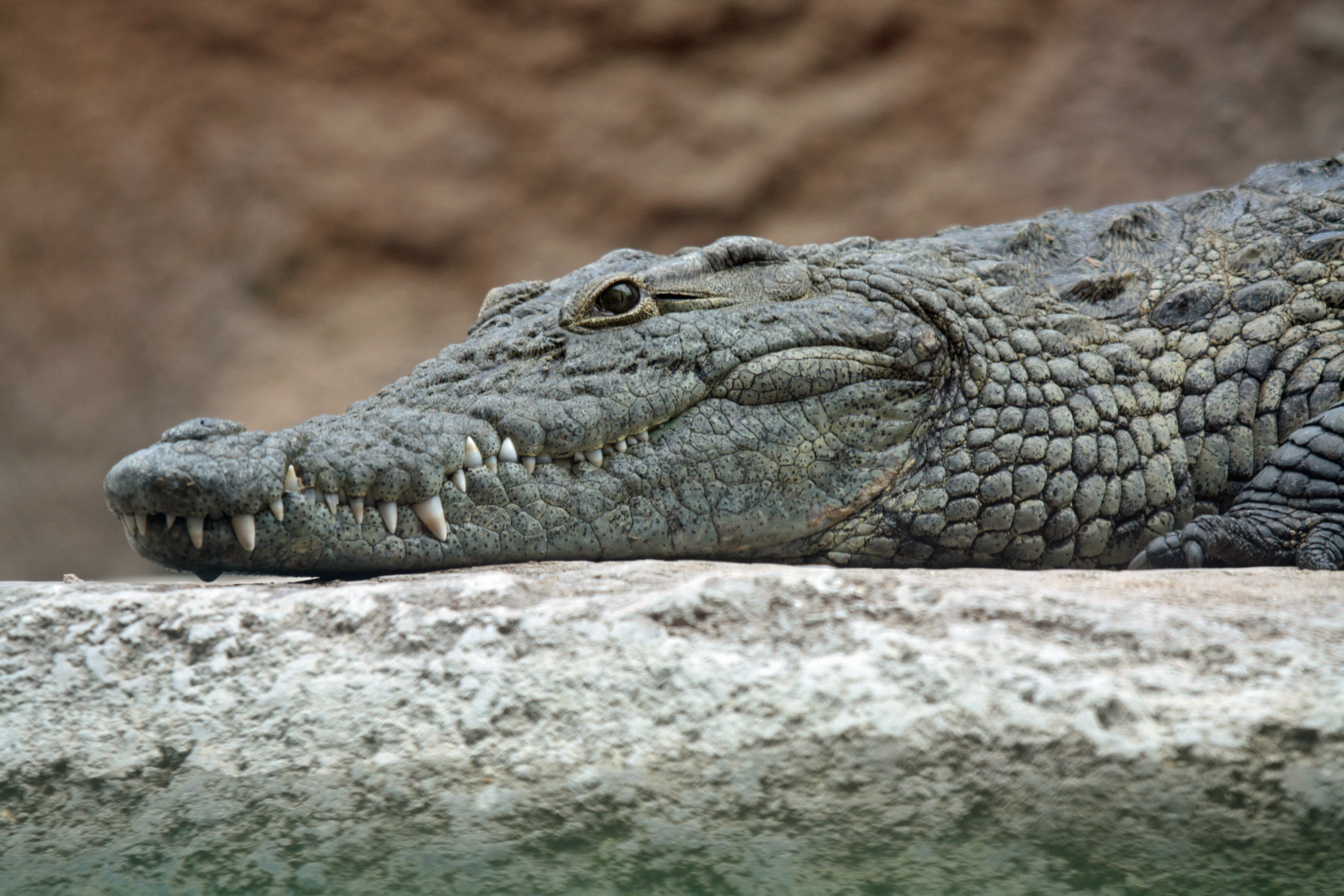
- Nile crocodile (Crocodylus niloticus)

Scientific classification
- Kingdom: Animalia
- Phylum: Chordata
- Class: Reptilia
- Clade: Romeriida
- Clade: Diapsida; Osborn, 1903

Subgroups
- †Dolerosaurus; †Araeoscelidia?; †Millerettidae?; †Parareptilia?; †Varanopidae (or at least some of its members)?; Neodiapsida; †Acallosuchus; †Claudiosaurus; †Elachistosuchus; †Eunotosaurus?; †Galesphyrus?; †Kenyasaurus; †Kudnu; †Lanthanolania?; †Maiothisavros?; †Orovenator?; †Palacrodon; †Palaeagama; †Saurosternon; †Younginiformes (possibly paraphyletic); †Tangasauridae; †Younginidae; †Avicephala (possibly non-monophyletic); †Drepanosauromorpha; †Weigeltisauridae; †Choristodera; †Ichthyosauromorpha; †Sauropterygiformes; †Thalattosauria; Sauria (modern reptiles and birds)

= Diapsid =

Diapsida Temporal range: Permian–Present possible Late Carboniferous records

Clade of reptiles with two holes in each side of their skulls

Diapsids ("two arches") are a clade of sauropsids, distinguished from other reptiles by the presence (at least ancestrally) of two holes, known as temporal fenestrae, in each side of their skulls. The earliest traditionally identified diapsids, the araeoscelidians, appeared about three hundred million years ago during the late Carboniferous period. All diapsids other than the most primitive ones in the clade Araeoscelidia are often placed into the clade Neodiapsida, which appeared during the following Permian. The diapsids are extremely diverse, and in a cladistic sense, include birds and all modern reptile groups, including turtles (which are physically anapsid), which were historically thought to lie outside the group. Recent studies have questioned the relationship of Araeoscelidia to Neodiapsida, with cladistic analyses suggesting the diapsid condition of araeoscelidians was evolved independently of neodiapsids.

All modern reptiles and birds are placed within the neodiapsid subclade Sauria. Although some diapsids have lost either one hole (lizards), or both holes (snakes and turtles), or have a heavily restructured skull (modern birds), they are still classified as diapsids based on their ancestry. At least 17,084 species of diapsid animals are extant: 9,159 birds, and 7,925 snakes, lizards, tuatara, turtles, and crocodiles.

== Characteristics ==
Diagram of a generic diapsid skull in side-on view with two temporal fenestrae at the back of the skull, enclosed by the jugal (j) postorbital (po) parietal (p) squamosal (sq) and quadratojugal (qj) bones

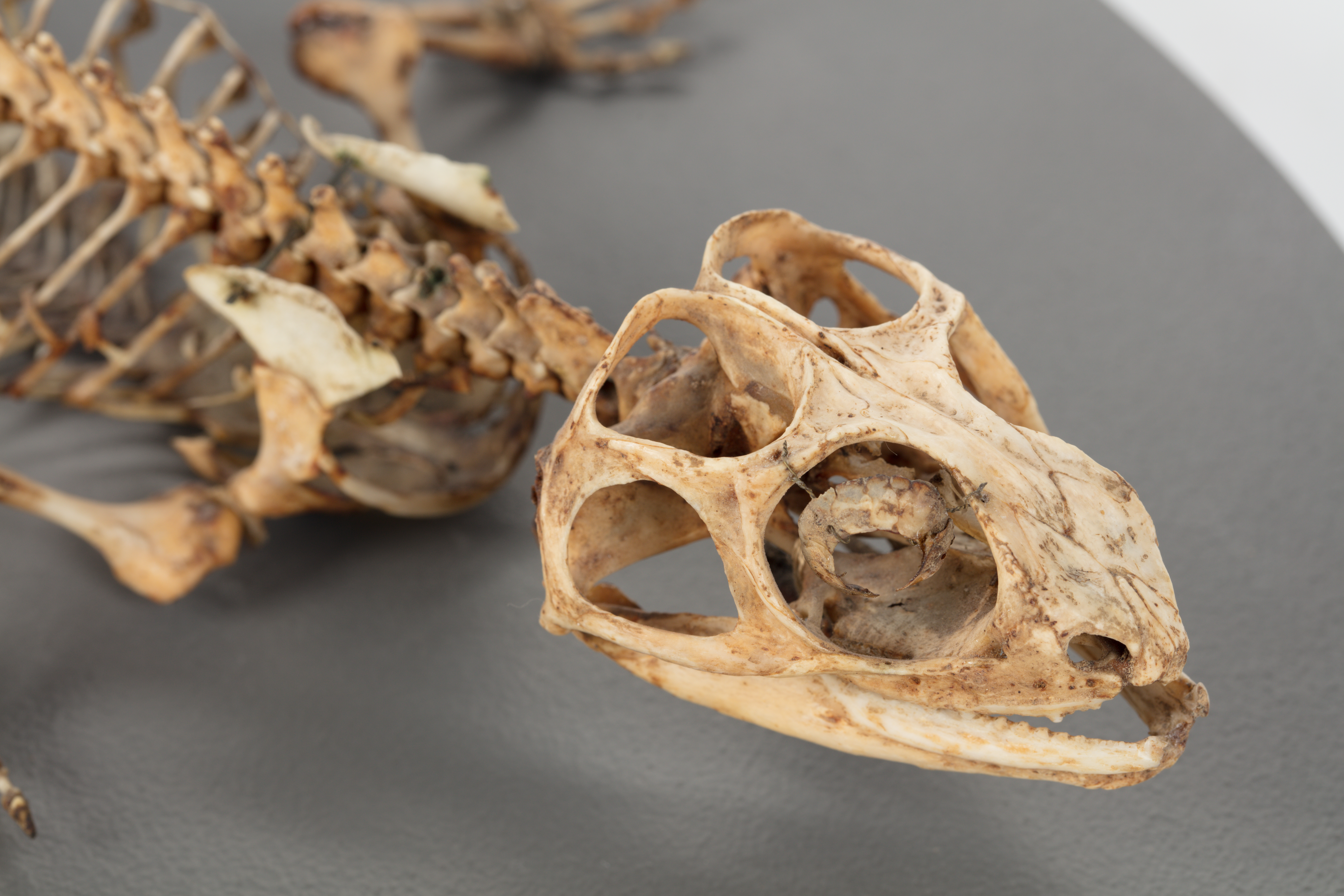
Skull of the tuatara (Sphenodon punctatus), which has a classic diapsid condition with two completely enclosed temporal fenestrae

Diapsids are characterised by (at least ancestrally) having two pairs of upper and lower temporal fenestrae (openings) at the back of the skull. Neodiapsids are distinguished by the evolution of an upper temporal fenestra, as in earlier reptiles closely related to neodiapsids a lower temporal fenestra is already present. The presence of a closed lower temporal bar (also known as temporal arcade) enclosing the bottom of the lower temporal fenestra via the connection of the quadratojugal and jugal is highly variable in neodiapsids, even in early members of the group.

Neodiapsids have a tympanum for hearing (a shared ancestral trait with milleretiids, with which they are grouped into Parapleurota). In the earliest neodiapsids (such as younginids) the tympanum is supported by the quadrate, quadratojugal, and squamosal bones of the skull, while in more derived non-saurian neodiapsids (e.g. tangasaurids) and Sauria, it is largely supported by the quadrate alone. Distinctive synapomorphies found ancestrally in neodiapsids include an ossified (bony) sternum, ribs being present on at least 13 or more of the caudal vertebrae of the tail, and the pisiform bone of the hand having a much greater size than the fourth metacarpal.^{supplemental material}

Basal non-saurian neodiapsids such as younginids and tangasaurids were ancestrally lizard-like, but basal non-saurian neodiapsids include aquatic/amphibious taxa (Claudiosaurus and some tangasaurids) the gliding lizard-like Weigeltisauridae, as well as the Triassic chameleon-like drepanosaurs.

== Classification ==
Diapsids were originally classified as one of four subclasses of the class Reptilia, all of which were based on the number and arrangement of openings in the skull. The other three subclasses were Synapsida (one opening low on the skull, for the "mammal-like reptiles"), Anapsida (no skull opening, including turtles and their relatives), and Euryapsida (one opening high on the skull, including many prehistoric marine reptiles). With the advent of phylogenetic nomenclature, this system of classification was heavily modified. Today, the synapsids are often not considered true reptiles, while Euryapsida were found to be an unnatural assemblage of diapsids that had lost one of their skull openings. Genetic studies and the discovery of the Triassic Pappochelys have shown that this is also the case in turtles, which are actually heavily modified diapsids. In phylogenetic systems, birds (descendants of traditional diapsid reptiles) are also considered to be members of this group.

Some modern studies of reptile relationships have preferred to use the name "diapsid" to refer to the crown group of all modern diapsid reptiles but not their extinct relatives. However, many researchers have also favored a more traditional definition that includes the prehistoric araeoscelidians. In 1991, Laurin defined Diapsida as a clade, "the most recent common ancestor of araeoscelidians, lepidosaurs, and archosaurs, and all its descendants".

The clade Neodiapsida was given a phylogenetic definition by Laurin in 1991. He defined it as the branch-based clade containing all animals more closely related to "Younginiformes" (later, more specifically, emended to Youngina capensis) than to Petrolacosaurus (representing Araeoscelidia). The earliest known neodiapsids like Orovenator are known from the Early Permian, around 290 million years ago.

All genetic studies have supported the hypothesis that turtles are cladistically diapsid reptiles despite being morphologically anapsid, most placing them as more closely related to living archosaurs (including crocodiles and birds) than to lepidosaurs (lizards, snakes, etc).. Recent morphological studies have found robust support for a turtle-archosaur relationship, forming Archelosauria.

Modern reptiles and birds are placed within the neodiapsid subclade Sauria, defined as the last common ancestor of Lepidosauria (which includes lizards, snakes and the tuatara), and Archosauria (which includes crocodilians and dinosaurs, including birds, among others) .. However, with increasing support for the placement of turtles among other living reptiles, 'Sauria' becomes synonymous with Reptilia according to the PhyloCode.

A cladistic analysis by Laurin and Piñeiro (2017) recovers Parareptilia as part of Diapsida, with pareiasaurs, turtles, millerettids, and procolophonoids recovered as more derived than the basal diapsid Younginia. A 2020 study by David P. Ford and Roger B. J. Benson also recovered Parareptilia as deeply nested within Diapsida, as the sister group to Neodiapsida. They united this relationship between Parareptilia and Neodiapsida in the new clade Neoreptilia, defining it as the last common ancestor and all descendants of Procolophon trigoniceps and Youngina capensis. However, this excludes mesosaurs, who were found to be basal among the sauropsids. Other recent studies have found the more traditional arrangement of parareptiles being outside of Diapsida.

The position of the highly derived Mesozoic marine reptile groups Thalattosauria, Ichthyosauromorpha and Sauropterygia within Neodiapsida is uncertain, and they may lie within crown Reptilia.

In studies from the early 2020s onwards, Araeoscelidia has been found to be unrelated to neodiapsids, with araeoscielidians even being recovered outside Sauropsida as stem-amniotes in one study. Other studies have instead found araeoscelidians as the earliest diverging clade of total-group reptiles. In both instances, the term 'Diapsida' strictly encompassing a group of sauropsids encompassing neodiapsids and their close relatives is not supported, and the abandonment of this has term been encouraged.

=== Relationships ===
Below are cladograms showing the relations of the major groups of diapsids.

Cladogram after Bickelmann et al., 2009 and Reisz et al., 2011:

- Sauropsida
  - †Parareptilia
    - - †Millerettidae
    - - - †Eunotosaurus
      - †Hallucicrania
        - †Lanthanosuchidae
        - †Procolophonia
          - †Procolophonoidea
          - †Pareiasauromorpha
  - Eureptilia
    - - †Captorhinidae
    - Romeriida
      - - †Paleothyris
      - Diapsida
        - †Araeoscelidia
        - Neodiapsida
          - †Orovenator
          - - †Lanthanolania
            - - †Tangasauridae
              - - †Younginidae
                - - - †Claudiosaurus
                  - - - - †Palaeagama
                        - †Saurosternon
                    - - - †Coelurosauravus
                      - - - †Thalattosauria
                          - - †Hupehsuchia
                            - †Ichthyopterygia
                        - Sauria
                          - Lepidosauromorpha
                          - Archosauromorpha

The cladogram of Lee (2013) below used a combination of genetic (molecular) and fossil (morphological) data.

- Diapsida
  - †Araeoscelidia
  - Neodiapsida
    - †Claudiosaurus
    - - †Younginiformes
      - Sauria
        - Lepidosauromorpha
          - †Kuehneosauridae
          - Lepidosauria
            - Rhynchocephalia (tuatara and their extinct relatives)
            - Squamata (lizards and snakes)
        - Archosauromorpha
          - †Choristodera
          - - †Prolacertiformes
            - - - †Rhynchosauria
                - †Trilophosaurus
              - Archosauriformes (crocodiles, birds, and their extinct relatives)

This second cladogram is based on the 2017 study by Pritchard and Nesbitt.

- Neodiapsida
  - †Orovenator
  - - †Drepanosauromorpha
    - - †Weigeltisauridae
      - - †Claudiosaurus
        - - †Tangasauridae (Hovasaurus, Thadeosaurus, Acerosodontosaurus)
          - †Younginidae (Youngina, Scyllacerta)
          - Sauria
            - Lepidosauria
            - Archosauromorpha
              - †Protorosaurus
              - - †Tanystropheidae
                - - †Rhynchosauria
                  - - †Allokotosauria
                    - - †Prolacerta
                      - Archosauriformes

The following cladogram was found by Simões et al. (2022):

- Neoreptilia
  - †Procolophonomorpha
  - Neodiapsida
    - †Younginiformes
    - - †Eunotosaurus
      - - †Weigeltisauridae
        - Sauria
          - Lepidosauromorpha
            - Rhynchocephalia (tuatara and their extinct relatives)
            - Squamata (lizards and snakes)
          - Archelosauria
            - Pantestudines (turtles and extinct relatives)
            - Archosauromorpha
              - - †Ichthyosauromorpha
                - - †Sauropterygia
                  - †Thalattosauria
              - - †Protorosauria
                  - †Protorosauridae
                  - - †Tanystropheidae
                    - - †Drepanosauromorpha
                      - †Kuehneosauridae
                - - - †Allokotosauria
                    - †Rhynchosauria
                  - Archosauriformes (crocodiles, birds, and their extinct relatives)

The following cladogram was found by Jenkins et al. (2025). Traditional parareptiles are highlighted in orange:

- Sauropsida (=Diapsida)
  - †Araeoscelidia
  - - †Bolosauridae
    - Neoreptilia
      - †Ankyramorpha
        - †Acleistorhinidae
        - - †Pareiasauromorpha
          - †Procolophonoidea
      - - †Mesosauridae
        - - - †Cabarzia
            - - †Ascendonanus
              - †Orovenator
          - Parapleurota
            - †Millerettidae
            - Neodiapsida
              - †Younginidae
              - - †Tangasauridae
                - - †Weigeltisauridae
                  - - †Claudiosaurus
                    - Sauria
                      - Lepidosauromorpha
                      - Archosauromorpha

== See also ==
- Vertebrate paleontology – Scientific study of prehistoric vertebrates
- Synapsida – Clade of tetrapods
- Anapsid – Paraphyletic grouping of reptiles
- Euryapsida – Group of extinct reptiles
