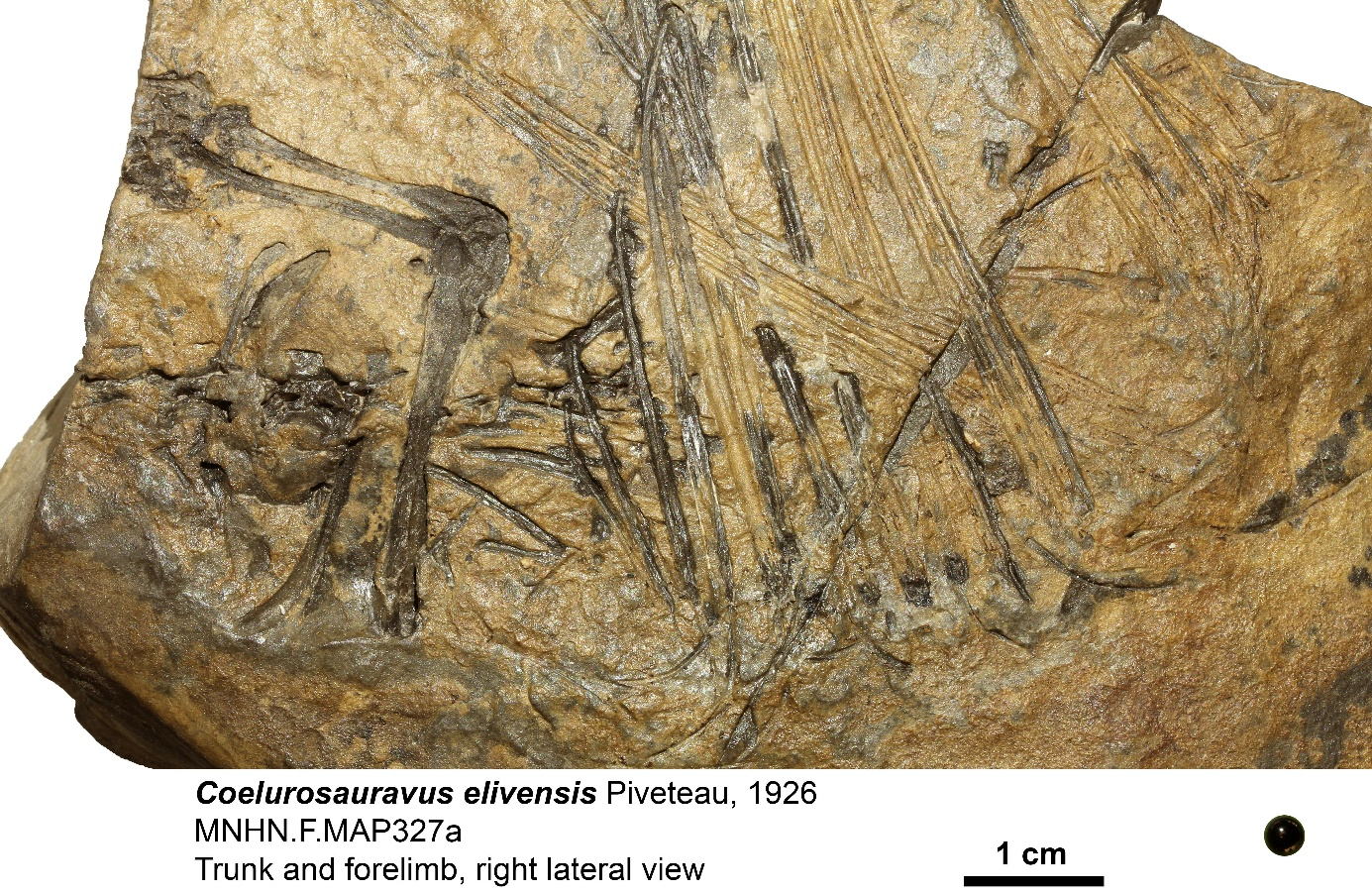
- Specimen MNHN.F.MAP327a, an external mould preserving the forelimb as well as the torso including the rod-like gliding patagial bones

Scientific classification
- Kingdom: Animalia
- Phylum: Chordata
- Class: Reptilia
- Family: †Weigeltisauridae
- Genus: †Coelurosauravus; Piveteau 1926

Type species
- †Coelurosauravus elivensis Piveteau, 1926

Synonyms
- Daedalosaurus madagascariensis Carroll 1978

= Coelurosauravus =

Coelurosauravus Temporal range: Lopingian ~260.4–251 Ma

Extinct genus of reptiles

Coelurosauravus (meaning "hollow-tailed lizard grandfather") is an extinct genus of gliding reptile, known from the Late Permian of Madagascar. Like other members of the family Weigeltisauridae, members of this genus possessed long, rod-like ossifications projecting outwards from the body. These bony rods were not extensions of the ribs but were instead a feature unique to weigeltisaurids. It is believed that during life, these structures formed folding wings used for gliding flight, similar to living gliding Draco lizards.

Coelurosauravus is solely known from the type species, C. elivensis, which was named by Jean Piveteau in 1926 based on fossils from the Lower Sakamena Formation of Madagascar. The species Weigeltisaurus jaekeli from Europe was formerly considered a species of Coelurosauravus, but is now placed in its own genus.

== History of discovery ==
The only known specimens of Coelurosauravus were collected in 1907–1908 by J.-M. Colcanap, a captain of the French colonial infantry, in southwest Madagascar. The precise location is not known, but it is likely from Mount Eliva near the upstream part of the Sakamena River, a tributary of the Onilahy River. In 1926, the specimens were described by Jean Piveteau as Coelurosauravus elivensis. In 1930 Weigeltisaurus jaekeli was described from specimens Germany. This European species is now known from numerous specimens found in Germany (and one in England), of which some were very well preserved. In 1987, Weigeltisaurus jaekeli was synonymized with Coelurosauravus as a second species, Coelurosauravus jaekeli. However, a 2015 study reinstated Weigeltisaurus as a separate genus for "Coelurosauravus" jaekeli, which has been retained by subsequent authors. In 1979 Robert L. Carroll placed one of the C. elivensis specimens into the new genus and species Daedalosaurus madigascariensis, based on supposed differences with the holotype specimen, but it has subsequently been regarded as not distinct from C. elivensis.

=== List of specimens ===
- IP 1908-11-21a: Holotype of C. elivensis (Piveteau, 1926). A poorly preserved skull and partial skeleton.
- IP 1908-11-22a: A part and counterpart (IP 1908-11-23a) containing skull fragments and the anterior half of a skeleton.
- IP 1908-5-2: Holotype of Daedalosaurus madagascariensis (Carroll, 1978). A part and counterpart (IP 1908-5-2b) of a partial skeleton including skull pieces and gliding structures.

== Description ==
Skull diagram of Coelurosauravus

Size of Coelurosauravus (left) with wings outstretched, compared to the closely related Weigeltisaurus and the much smaller living gliding lizard Draco volans

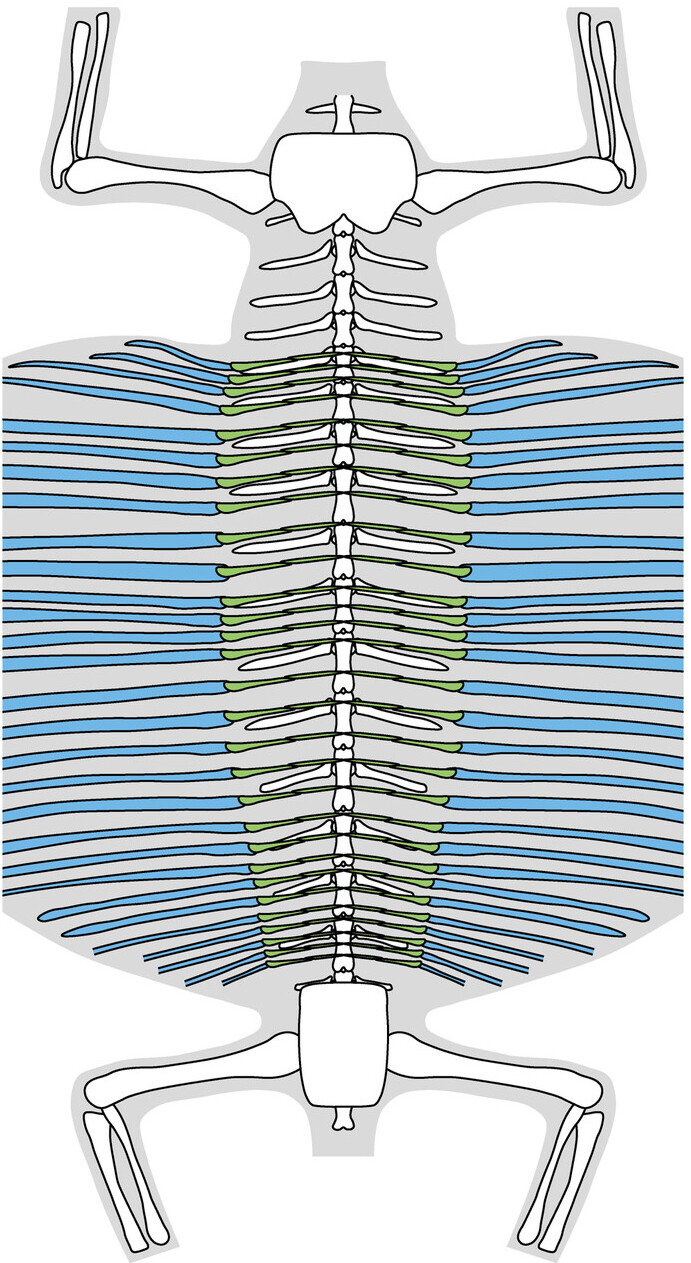
Reconstruction of the trunk of Coelurosauravus showing articulation of the patagial bones (blue) with the gastralia (green) in the lower belly, as opposed to the ribs (in white along with the other bones)

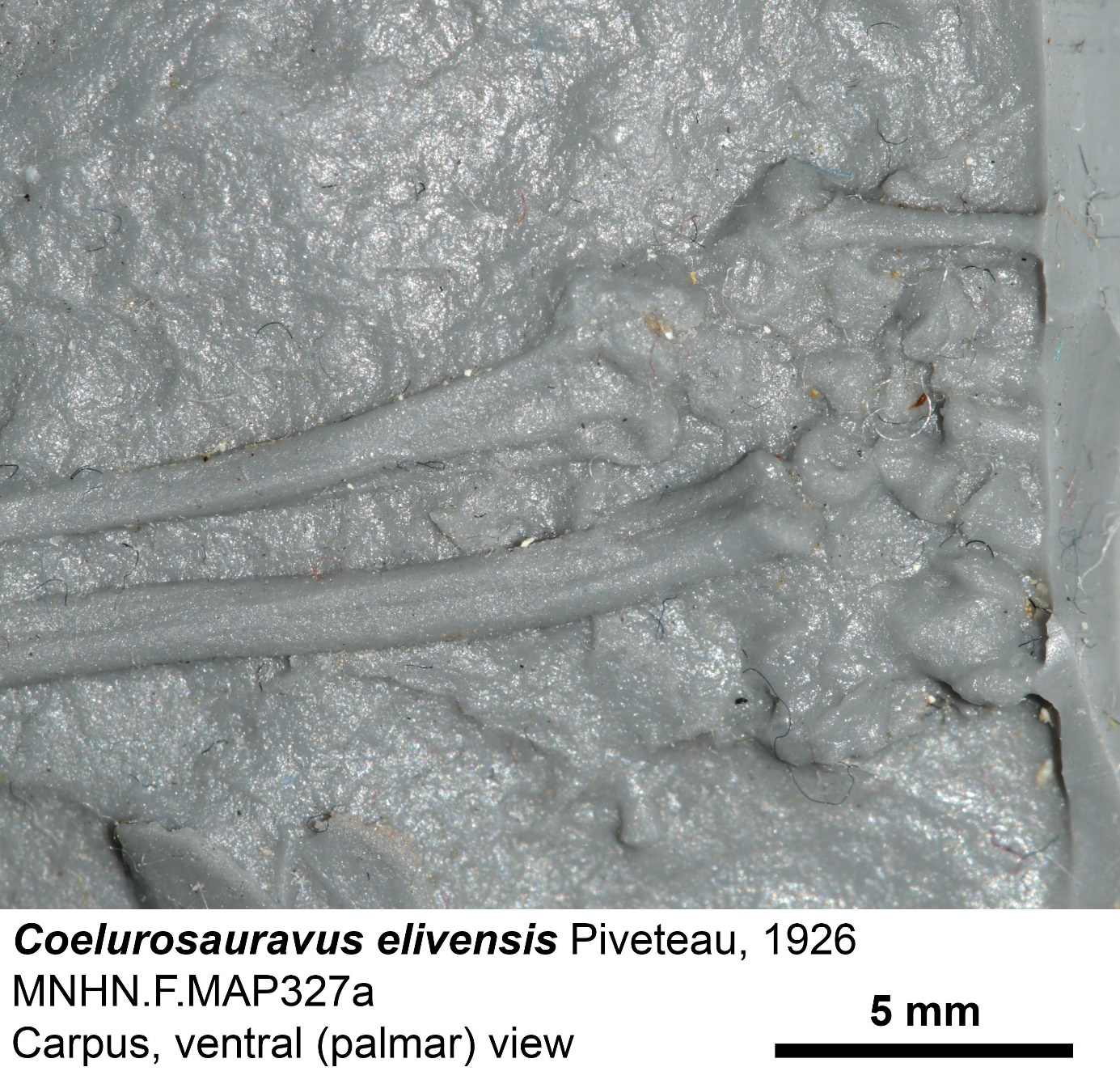
Carpal bones preserved as a cast of a mould

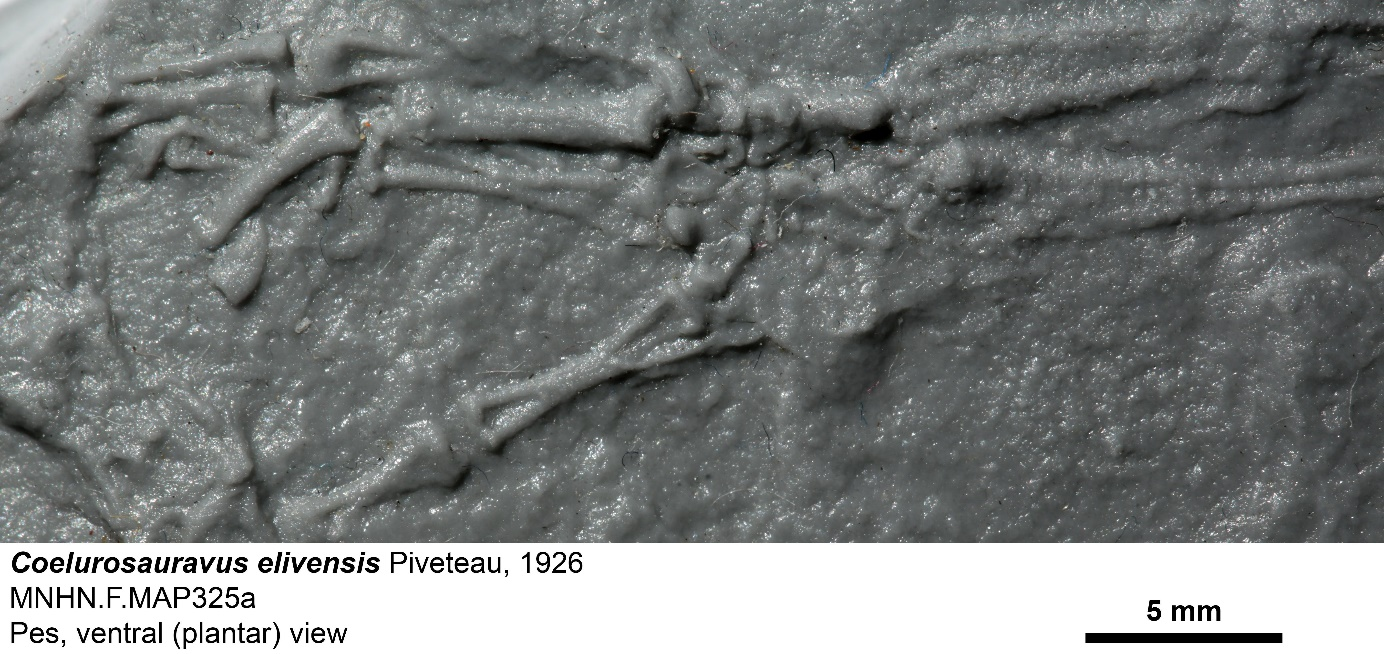
Bones of the hindfoot preserved as a cast of a mould

External image
- Skeletal diagram of Coelurosauravus

The skull of Coelurosauravus is the smallest of the weigeltisaurids, with a mature skull length of 3.5 centimetres (1.4 in) around half those of other weigeltisaurids. The total combined head and torso length is 18 centimetres (7.1 in), reaching a length of at least 32 centimetres (13 in) including the preserved length of the tail. Like other weigeltisaurids, the skull bones are covered in cranial ornamentation, consisting of low tubercles and spikes, including a horned frill present on the squamosal bone. In contrast to Weigeltisaurus, only tubercles, rather than spikes, are present on the parietal bone, which is also shared with Glaurung. The teeth are simple and conical in shape and packed into a dense row. The teeth sequentially decrease in size posteriorly. Compared to Weigeltisaurus, Coelourosauravus has a shorter neck and longer thorax (which is also flattened), and like other weigeltisaurids the tail is elongate. Like other weigeltisaurids, the penultimate phalanges are elongated, which in combination with their recurved unguals indicative of claws were likely an adaption to cling to tree bark. At least 29 pairs of long, elongate rod-shaped bones project from the sides of the body, dubbed "patagials". These are roughly equally spaced along the trunk. The first nine patagials show a rapid increase in size, with the ninth being the longest of all of the patagials, with the remaining pairs gradually decreasing in size posteriorly. When fully opened, the patagials would have given a wingspan of 35 centimetres (14 in). Coelurosauravus is suggested to differ from Weigeltisaurus in proportions of the patagials.

== Paleobiology ==
Though no stomach contents have been found, Coelurosauravus and other weigeltisaurids have been interpreted as arboreal insectivores. The simple conical teeth of Coelurosauravus are well adapted to the piercing of arthropod cuticle. The cranial ornamentation may have served a display purpose.

=== Gliding ===
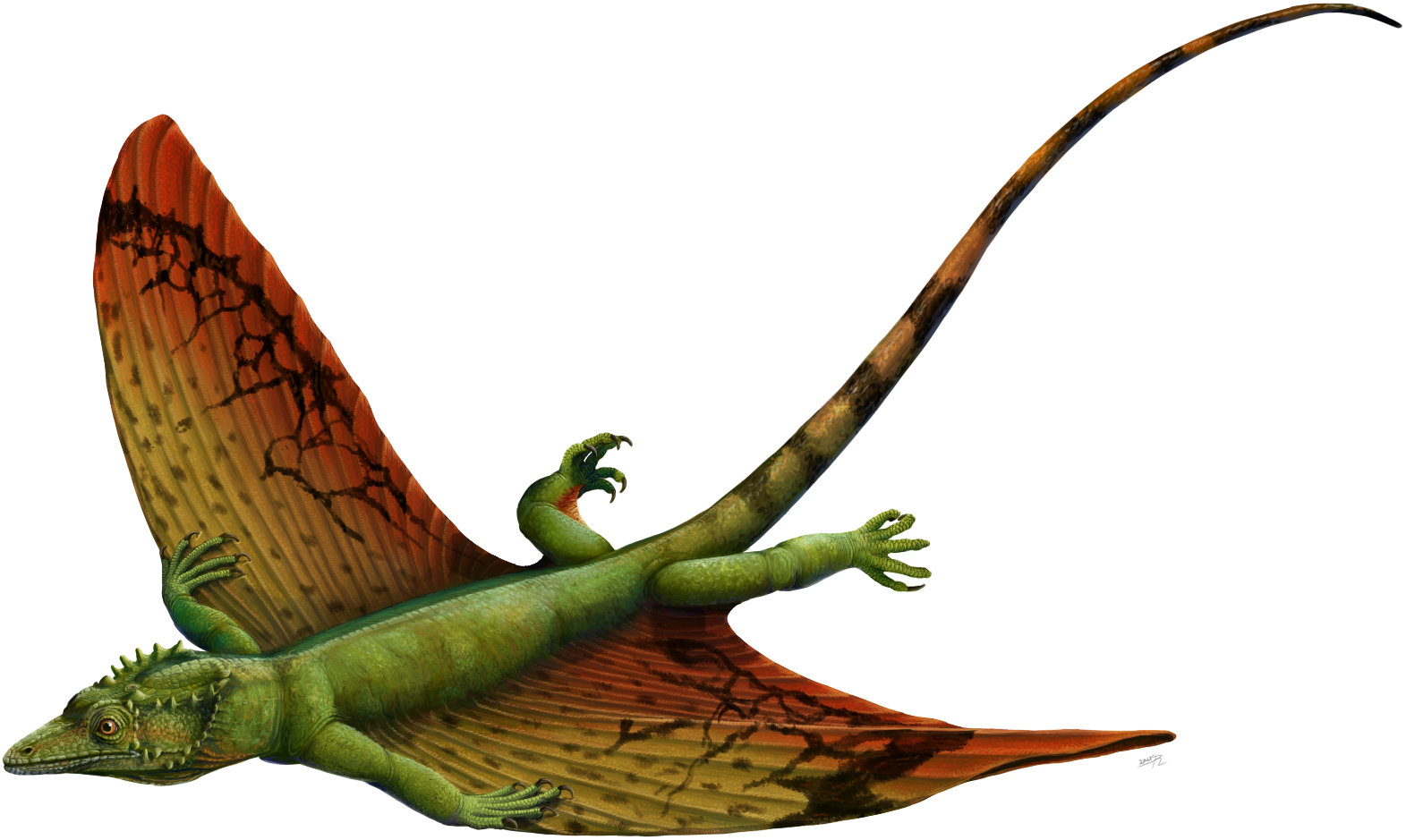
Life restoration of Weigeltisaurus jaekeli, a close relative of Coelurosauravus and formerly considered a member of the genus

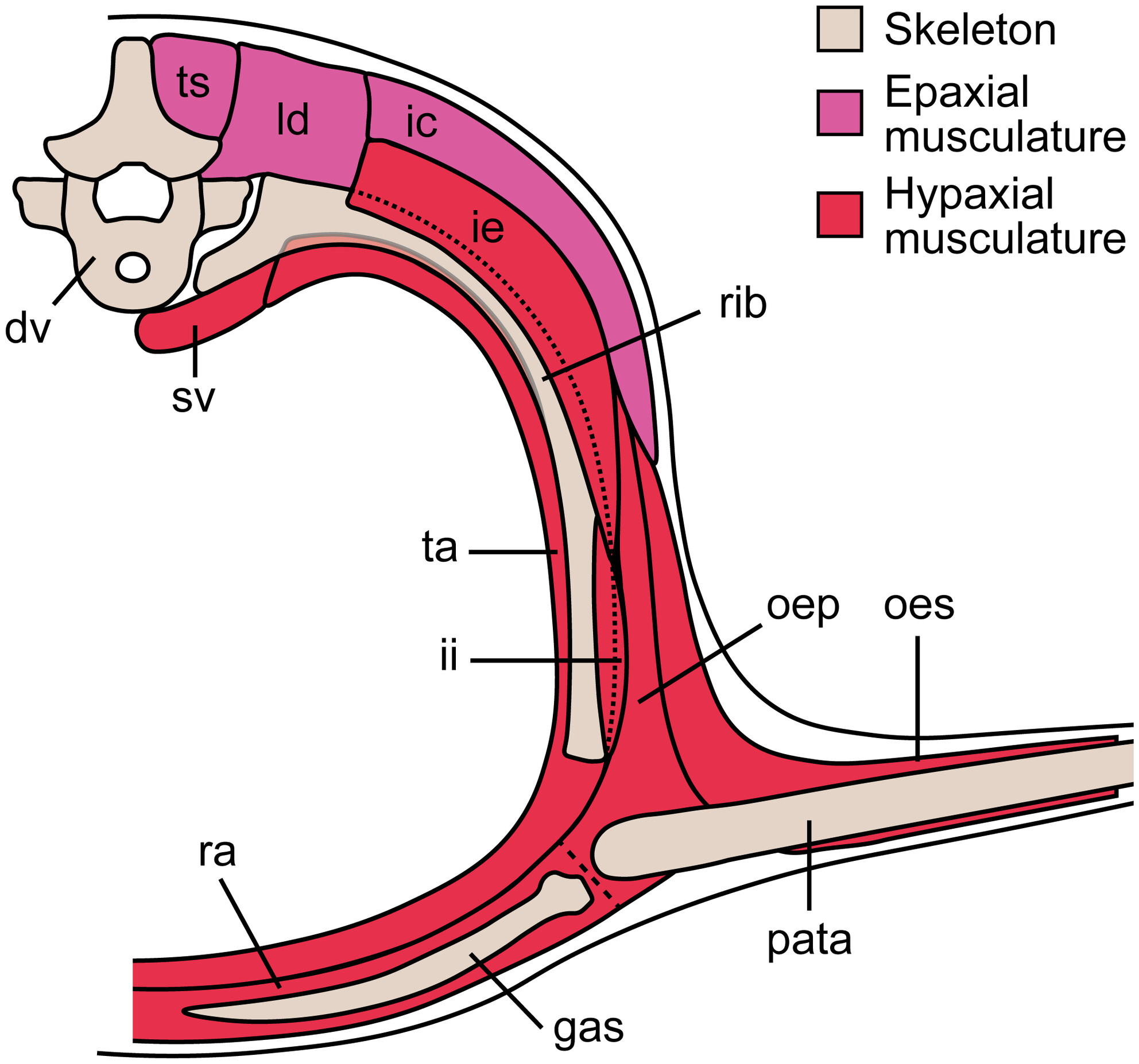
Cross section of the trunk of a weigeltisaurid, showing the articulation of the patagial bones (labeled pala) with the gastralia (labeled gas)

The rods originate from the lower-lateral surface of the body. The furling and unfurling of the gliding membrane were likely controlled by the abdominal muscles. The patagial bones had a dumbbell-shaped cross section, increasing their rigidity preventing the wing collapsing during flight. In living gliding lizards, it has been found that the forelimbs grab hold of the membrane during flight, suggesting that the forelimbs are used to control the patagium while in flight. Similar behaviour has been proposed for weigeltisaurids. This is supported the presence of an additional phalange in the fourth digit of the hands of weigeltisaurids, which would have allowed them to more effectively grasp the wing. In a 2011 study comparing Coelurosauravus elivensis and other extinct gliding reptiles to modern Draco species, Coelurosauravus was found to be a less efficient glider than modern Draco due to its larger body size, with a wing loading around 107.9 N/m^{2}, 4.5 times than higher than Draco, with a substantial drop in height per glide, corresponding with a steep descent angle of more than 45 degrees. However, some authors have considered that the unique configuration and aspect ratio of the wings of weigeltisaurids means that the comparison needs to be tested experimentally. A later 2025 study found that the body mass of Coelurosauravus had been overestimated and that it would have been a relatively efficient glider.

== Paleoenvironment ==
The Lower Sakamena Formation was deposited in a wetland environment situated within a North-South orientated rift valley, perhaps similar to Lake Tanganyika. The climate at the time of deposition was temperate, warm, and humid, with seasonal rainfall and possible monsoons. Flora from the formation includes the equisetalean Schizoneura, the glossopterid gymnosperm tree Glossopteris, and seed fern Lepidopteris. Other vertebrates known from the Lower Sakamena Formation include the palaeoniscoid fish Atherstonia, the procolophonoid parareptile Barasaurus, the neodiapsid reptiles Hovasaurus, Claudiosaurus, Thadeosaurus, and Acerosodontosaurus, fragments of rhinesuchid temnospondyls, an indeterminate theriodont therapsid and the dicynodont Oudenodon.

== See also ==
- Draco volans
- Kuehneosaurus
- Sharovipteryx
