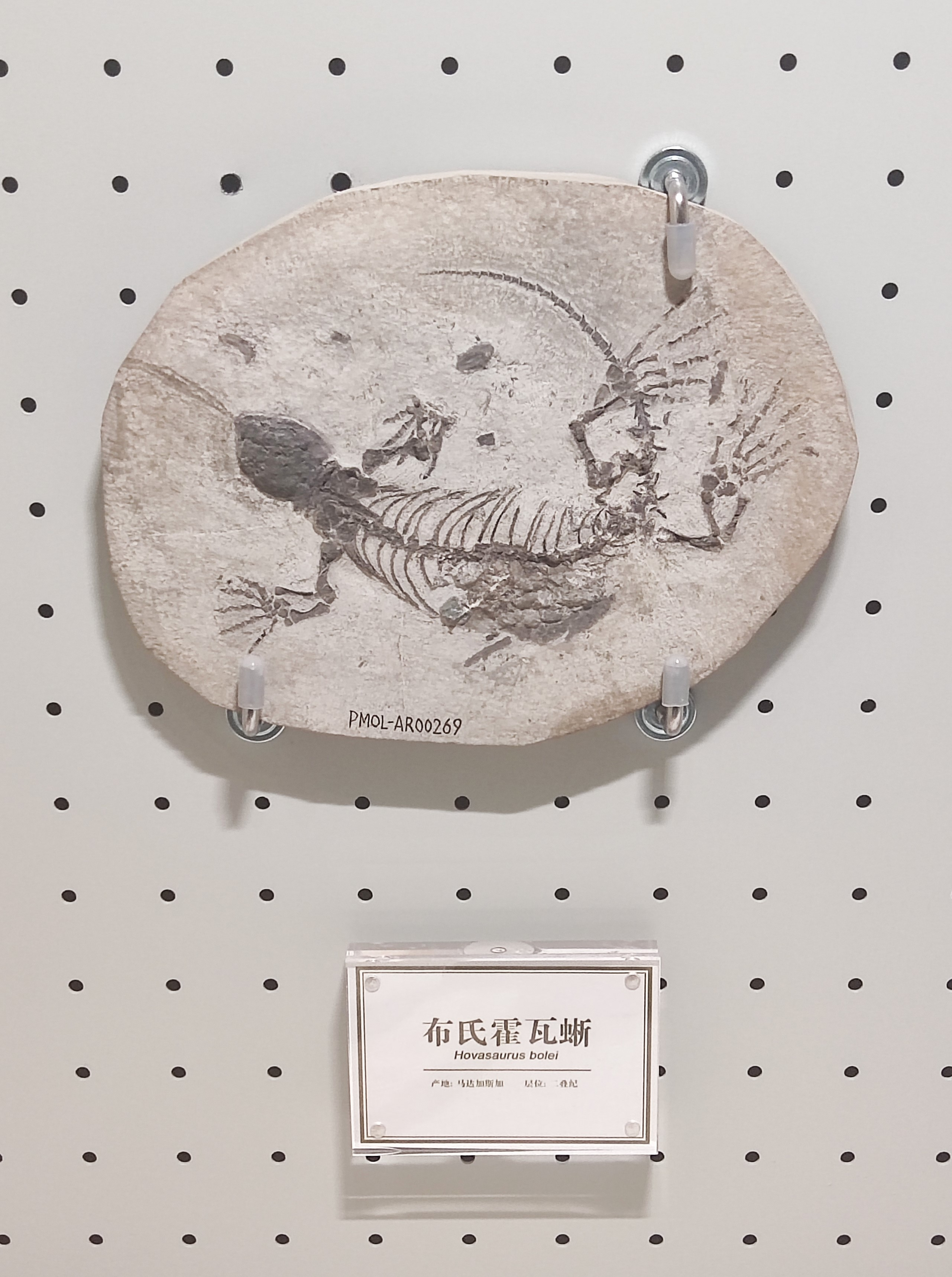
- Fossil in Liaoning Palaeontological Museum

Scientific classification
- Kingdom: Animalia
- Phylum: Chordata
- Class: Reptilia
- Family: †Tangasauridae
- Genus: †Hovasaurus; Piveteau, 1926

Type species
- †Hovasaurus boulei Piveteau, 1926

= Hovasaurus =

Hovasaurus Temporal range: 252.3–247.2 Ma

Extinct genus of reptiles

Hovasaurus is an extinct genus of basal diapsid reptile. It lived in what is now Madagascar during the Late Permian and Early Triassic, being a survivor of the Permian–Triassic extinction event and the paleontologically youngest member of the Tangasauridae. Fossils have been found in the Permian Lower and Triassic Middle Sakamena Formations of the Sakamena Group, where it is amongst the commonest fossils. Its morphology suggests an aquatic ecology.

== Description ==
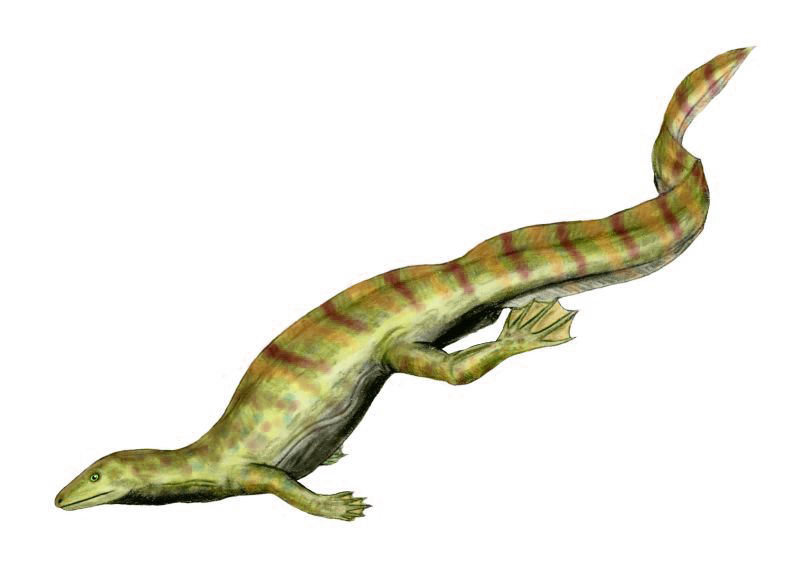
Life restoration

Size comparison

Hovasaurus resembled a slender lizard, two thirds of total length was taken up by its long tail. It had snout-vent length up to 35 centimetres (14 in) long, with 60 centimetres (24 in) long tail. It was well adapted to an aquatic life, with the tail being laterally flattened like that of a sea snake. Some stones have been found in the abdomen of fossil Hovasaurus, indicating the creatures swallowed these for ballast, preventing them from floating to the surface when hunting fish.

== Paleoenvironment ==
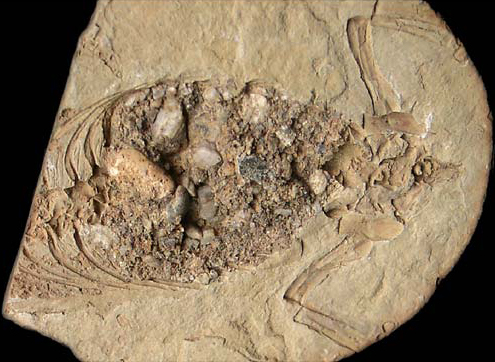
Specimen with gastroliths

The Lower Sakamena Formation was deposited in a wetland environment situated within a North-South orientated rift valley, perhaps similar to Lake Tanganyika. The climate at the time of deposition was temperate, warm, and humid, with seasonal rainfall and possible monsoons. Flora from the formation includes the equisetalean Schizoneura, Glossopteris, and seed fern Lepidopteris. Other vertebrates known from the Lower Sakamena Formation include the palaeoniscoid fish Atherstonia, the procolophonid parareptile Barasaurus, the gliding weigeltisaurid reptile Coelurosauravus, neodiapsids Claudiosaurus, Thadeosaurus, and Acerosodontosaurus, fragments of rhinesuchid temnospondyls, an indeteriminate theriodont therapsid and the dicynodont Oudenodon.
