= 1981 in paleontology =

Paleontology or palaeontology is the study of prehistoric life forms on Earth through the examination of plant and animal fossils. This includes the study of body fossils, tracks (ichnites), burrows, cast-off parts, fossilised feces (coprolites), palynomorphs and chemical residues. Because humans have encountered fossils for millennia, paleontology has a long history both before and after becoming formalized as a science. This article records significant discoveries and events related to paleontology that occurred or were published in the year 1981.

== Plants ==
=== Angiosperms ===
==== Superrosids - Fabids ====
Name	Novelty	Status	Authors	Age	Unit	Location	Synonymized taxa	Notes	Images
Palaeocarpinus	Sp nov	Valid	Crane	Ypresian	Reading Formation	UK; England		A betulaceous fruit. Type species P. laciniata	
Pseudofagus	Gen et sp nov	Valid	Smiley & Huggins	Miocene; Langhian	Latah Formation; Clarkia Florule	USA; Idaho		A fagaceous genus The type species is P. idahoensis	

== Arthropoda ==
=== Insects ===
Name	Novelty	Status	Authors	Age	Unit	Location	Notes	Images
Protamblyopone inversa	Gen et sp. nov	jr synonym	Dlussky	Middle Miocene	Chon-Tyz mine	Kyrgyzstan	An Amblyoponin ant. jr synonym of Casaleia inversa	

== Reptilia ==
=== Early reptiles ===
Taxon	Novelty	Status	Author(s)	Age	Unit	Location	Notes	Images
Claudiosaurus germaini	Gen. et sp. nov.	Valid	Carroll	Late Permian	Lower Sakamena Formation	Madagascar	An early neodiapsid	
Thadeosaurus colcanapi	Gen. et sp. nov.	Valid	Carroll	Late Permian	Lower Sakamena Formation	Madagascar	An early neodiapsid	

=== Archosauromorpha ===
==== Dinosaurs ====
Taxon	Novelty	Status	Author(s)	Age	Unit	Location	Notes	Images
Avimimus portentosus	Gen. et sp. nov.	Valid taxon	Kurzanov	Campanian	Djadochta Formation	Mongolia	A very bird-like oviraptorosaur	
Barsboldia sicinskii	Gen. et sp. nov.	Valid	Maryańska & Osmólska	Maastrichtian	Nemegt Formation	Mongolia	A hadrosaurid of uncertain relations	
Elmisaurus rarus	Gen. et sp. nov.	Valid	Osmólska	Maastrichtian	Nemegt Formation	Mongolia	An oviraptorosaur	
Garudimimus brevipes	Gen. et sp. nov.	Valid	Barsbold	Santonian	Bayanshiree Formation	Mongolia	An early ornithomimosaur	
"Honghesaurus"		Nomen nudum	Anonymous				Later namedYandusaurus	
Ingenia yanshini	Gen. et sp. nov.	Preoccupied	Barsbold	Maastrichtian	Baruungoyot Formation	Mongolia	Generic name preoccupied by a nematode Gerlach 1957 and renamed Ajancingenia, but considered a species of Heyuannia	
Lambeosaurus laticaudus	Sp. nov.	Valid	Morris	Campanian	El Gallo Formation	Mexico	Later given the genus Magnapaulia	
Muttaburrasaurus langdoni	Gen. et sp. nov.	Valid	Bartholomai & Molnar	Albian	Mackunda Formation	Australia	An iguanodont with a horn-like knob of its Snout.	
Palaeopteryx thomsoni	Gen. et sp. nov.	Nomen dubium	Jensen	Kimmeridgian	Morrison Formation	Colorado	A coelurosaur	
Scutellosaurus lawleri	Gen. et sp. nov.	Valid	Colbert	Sinemurian	Kayenta Formation	Arizona	An early thyreophoran	

==== Birds ====
- Palaeopteryx thomsoni Jensen, 1981 is most likely not a bird but rather a small non-avian dinosaur.
- Plegadis pharangites Olson, 1981 is a new name for Plegadis gracilis Miller et Bowman, 1956, preoccupied by Plegadis gracilis (Lydekker, 1891), described as Milnea gracilis Lydekker, 1891 and transferred to the genus Plegadis Kaup, 1829 by Cheneval, 1984.

Name	Status	Novelty	Authors	Age	Unit	Location	Notes	Images
Burhinus lucorum	Valid	Sp. nov.	K. Jeffrey Bickart	Early Miocene	Middle Sheep Creek Formation	USA: Nebraska	A Burhinidae.	
Enantiornis leali	Valid	Gen. nov. et Sp. nov.	Cyril A. Walker	Late Cretaceous	Maastrichtian Lecho Formation	Argentina	An Enantiornithes Walker, 1981, Alexornithiformes Brodkorb, 1976, Enantiornithidae Nessov et Borkin, 1983, this is the type species of the new genus.	
Eogrus crudus	Valid	Sp. nov.	Evgeny N. Kurochkin	Middle-Late Eocene	Tsagan Kutel	Mongolia	A Gruiformes, Eogruidae Wetmore, 1934, this is the type species of the new genus.	
Falco medius	Valid	Sp. nov.	A. S. Umanskaya	Late Miocene	MN 11-13	USSR: Ukraine	A Falconidae.	
Gavia paradoxa	Valid	Sp. nov.	A. S. Umanskaya	Late Miocene	MN 11-13	USSR: Ukraine	A Gaviidae.	
Ioriotis gabunii	Valid	Gen. nov. et Sp. nov.	Nikolay I. Burchak-Abramovich Abesalom K. Vekua	Late Pliocene	Kvabebi	USSR: Georgia	An Otididae, this is the type species of the new genus.	
Mancalla emlongi	Valid	Sp. nov.	Storrs L. Olson	Late Pliocene	Blancan, San Diego Formation	USA: California	An Alcidae, Mancallinae L. H. Miller, 1946.	
Microdytes tonnii	Valid	Gen. nov. et Sp. nov.	George G. Simpson	Late Oligocene-Early Miocene	Patagonian	Argentina	A Sphniscidae, this is the type species of the new genus. Microdytes Simpson, 1981 is preoccupied by Microdytes Balfour-Browne, 1949 (Coleoptera), so Storrs L. Olson created the new genus Eretiscus Olson, 1986 to accommodate Microdytes tonnii Simpson, 1981.	
Pedinorhis stirpsarcana	Valid	Gen. nov. et Sp. nov.	Storrs L. Olson Mary C. McKitrick	Pleistocene	Cave deposits	Puerto Rico	A Fringillidae, Emberizinae, this is the type species of the new genus.	
Pelecanus cadimurka	Valid	Sp. nov.	Patricia Vickers Rich Gerard F. Van Tets	Pleistocene	Kuttipirra (Katipiri) Waterhole	Australia: South Australia	A Pelecanidae.	
Picus peregrinabundus	Valid	Sp. nov.	A. S. Umanskaja	Late Miocene	MN 11-12	USSR: Ukraine	A Picidae.	
Sonogrus gregalis	Valid	Gen. nov. et Sp. nov.	Evgeny N. Kurochkin	Late Eocene-Early Oligocene	Ergilin Dzo Formation	Mongolia	A Gruiformes, Eogruidae Wetmore, 1934, this is the type species of the new genus.	
Uria brodkorbi	Valid	Sp. nov.	Hildegarde Howard	Late Miocene	Sisquoc Formation, Clarendonian	USA: California	An Alcidae.	
Urmiornis orientalis	Valid	Sp. nov.	Evgeny N. Kurochkin	Middle Pliocene		USSR: Kazakhstan	A Gruiformes, Eogruidae Wetmore, 1934, transferred to the genus Amphipelargus Lydekker, 1891 by both Kurochkin, 1985 and Olson, 1985.	
Urmiornis ukrainus	Valid	Sp. nov.	Evgeny N. Kurochkin	Late Miocene	Mn 9-10-11	USSR: Moldova; Ukraine; Russia	A Gruiformes, Eogruidae Wetmore, 1934, transferred to the genus Amphipelargus Lydekker, 1891 by both Kurochkin, 1985 and Olson, 1985.	
Youngornis gracilis	Valid	Gen. nov et Sp. nov.	Yeh Hsiangk'uei	Middle Miocene	Shanwang Formation	China	A Rallidae, this is the type species of the new genus.	
Zeltornis ginsburgi	Valid	Gen. nov et Sp. nov.	Jean Chr. Balouet	Early Miocene	Late Burdigalian, Djebel Zelten	Libya	An Ardeidae, this is the type species of the new genus.	

== Plesiosaurs ==
- Carroll, R. C., 1981, Plesiosaur ancestors from the Upper Permian of Madagascar: Philosophical Transactions of the Royal Society of London B, v. 293, p. 315- 383.

Name	Status	Authors	Age	Unit	Location	Notes	Images
Kimmerosaurus	Valid	Brown	Late Jurassic (Kimmeridgian	Kimmeridge Clay	UK	A cryptoclidid.	

== Pterosaurs ==
=== New taxa ===
Name	Status	Authors	Location	Images
Comodactylus	Valid	Galton	Germany	
Sultanuvaisia	Valid	Nesov		
