= Pelecanus cadimurka =

Pelecanus cadimurka Temporal range: Late Pliocene

Scientific classification
- Domain: Eukaryota
- Kingdom: Animalia
- Phylum: Chordata
- Class: Aves
- Order: Pelecaniformes
- Family: Pelecanidae
- Genus: Pelecanus
- Species: P. cadimurka

Binomial name
- Pelecanus cadimurka Rich & van Tets, 1981

Extinct species of pelican from Australia

Pelecanus cadimurka is an extinct species of pelican from the Late Pliocene Kanunka fauna of the upper Tirari Formation, in the Lake Eyre basin of north-eastern South Australia.

== History and naming ==
Pelecanus cadimurka was described in 1981 by Australian paleontologists Patricia Vickers-Rich and Gerard van Tets, alongside a variety of other pelican fossils collected throughout Australasia. The holotype (SAM P22501) is a partial left tarsometatarsus. Fragments of two right tarsometatarsi and a cervical vertebra have also been referred to the species. Its remains were found in a layer of the Pliocene-aged Tirari Formation of Lake Palankarinna, South Australia.

The species name references the Cadimurka, a large fish that dwells at the bottoms of waterholes along the Warburton River and, consequently, has never been seen. The authors did not specify as to what Aboriginal language the word comes from.

== Description ==
P. cadimurka was a small pelican, falling in the size range of the extant brown pelican and pink-backed pelican. It differs from all other pelicans by various details of its tarsometatarsus. The second trochlea lacks the squared off end of the brown pelican. The medial surface of the second trochlea lacks the long depression seen in Pelecanus tirarensis. It further differs from P. tirarensis in the slenderness of the third trochlea. Both the second and third trochlea extend an equal distance away from the tarsometatarsus. The only known cervical vertebra bears a close resemblance to those of the brown pelican.

== Paleobiology ==
The Tirari Formation is Late Pliocene in age, with a date range of 3.9-3.4 Ma. It can be split into three main divisions: the basal Mampuwordu Member, the medial Main Body, and the overlying Pompapillina Member. Pelecanus cadimurka originates from the Kanunka Fauna, which is a part of the Pompapillina Member. At the time, the region would have been a seasonally arid environment that may have housed fan-deltas, lakes and floodplains. It would have coexisted in this area alongside a large accipitrid, passeriforms, rallids, otids and a variety of waterbirds (including the extant Australian pelican).
