= Pelecanus halieus =

Pelecanus halieus Temporal range: Late Pliocene

Scientific classification
- Kingdom: Animalia
- Phylum: Chordata
- Class: Aves
- Order: Pelecaniformes
- Family: Pelecanidae
- Genus: Pelecanus
- Species: P. halieus

Binomial name
- Pelecanus halieus Wetmore, 1933

Extinct species of bird

Pelecanus halieus is a small fossil pelican described by Alexander Wetmore from material found in Late Pliocene deposits at Hagerman, Idaho.
