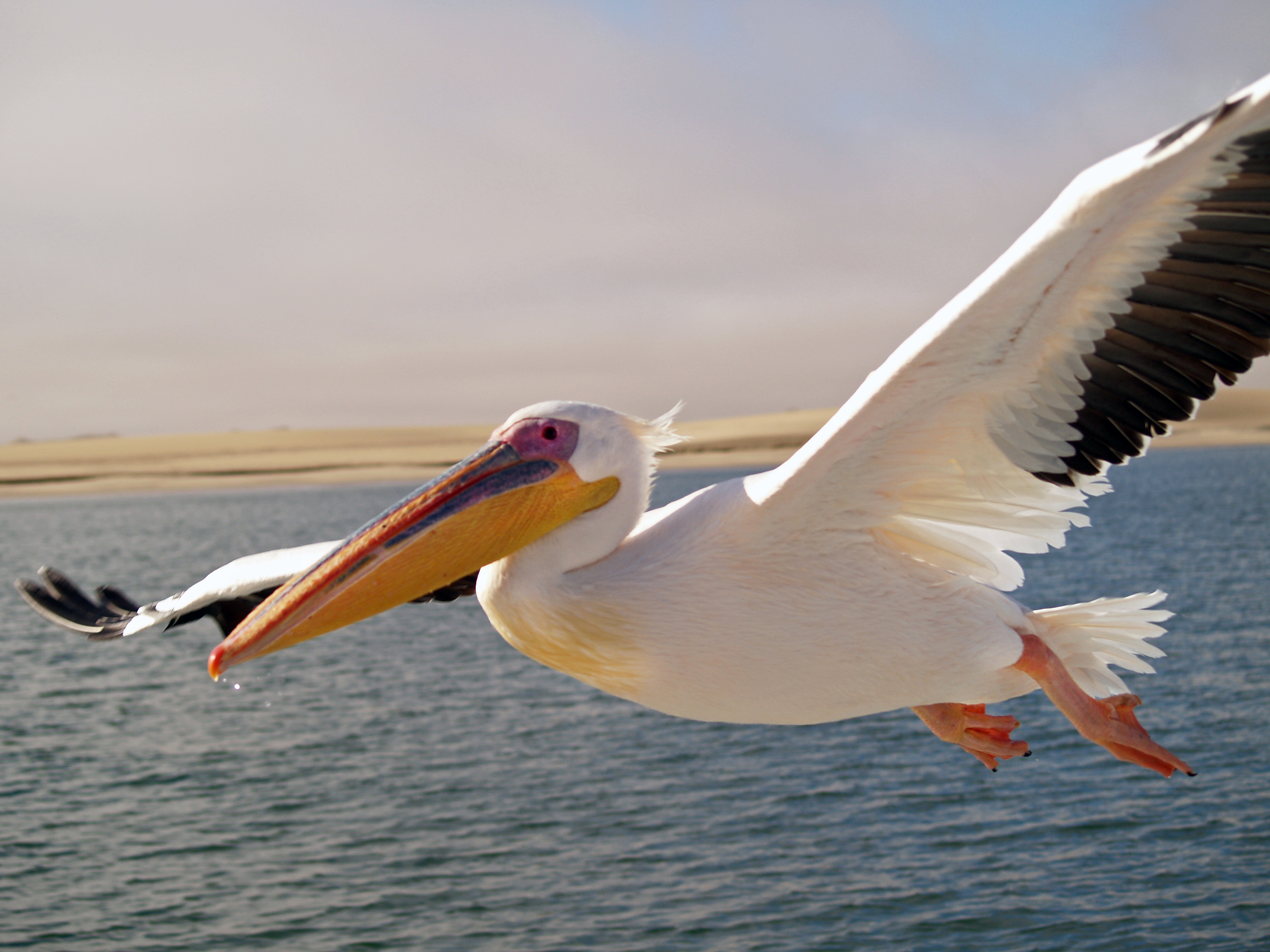
- A great white pelican in breeding condition flying over Walvis Bay, Namibia.

Scientific classification
- Kingdom: Animalia
- Phylum: Chordata
- Class: Aves
- Order: Pelecaniformes
- Family: Pelecanidae
- Genus: Pelecanus; Linnaeus, 1758

Type species
- Pelecanus onocrotalus Linnaeus, 1758

Species
- 8, see text

= Pelican =

Pelican Temporal range: late Eocene–Recent, 36–0 Ma Possible an early origin based on molecular clock

Genus of large water birds with a throat pouch

Pelicans (genus Pelecanus) are a genus of large water birds that make up the family Pelecanidae. They are characterized by a long beak and a large throat pouch used for catching prey and draining water from the scooped-up contents before swallowing. They have predominantly pale plumage, except for the brown and Peruvian pelicans. The bills, pouches, and bare facial skin of all pelicans become brightly coloured before the breeding season.

The eight living pelican species have a patchy, seasonally dependent yet global distribution, ranging latitudinally from the tropics to the temperate zone. Pelicans are absent from interior Amazonian South America, from polar regions and the open ocean; at least one species is known to migrate to the inland desert of Australia's Red Centre, after heavy rains create temporary lakes. White pelicans are also observed at the American state of Utah's Great Salt Lake, for example, some 600 miles (965 km) from the nearest coastline (the Pacific West Coast). They have also been seen hundreds of miles inland in North America, having flown northwards along the Mississippi River and other large waterways.

Long thought to be related to frigatebirds, cormorants, tropicbirds, and gannets and boobies, pelicans instead are most closely related to the shoebill and hamerkop storks (although these two birds are not actually true storks), and are placed in the order Pelecaniformes. Ibises, spoonbills, herons, and bitterns have been classified in the same order. They are thought to have evolved in the Old World and spread into the Americas; this is reflected in the relationships within the genus as the eight species divide into Old World and New World lineages. This hypothesis is supported by fossil evidence from the oldest pelican taxa.

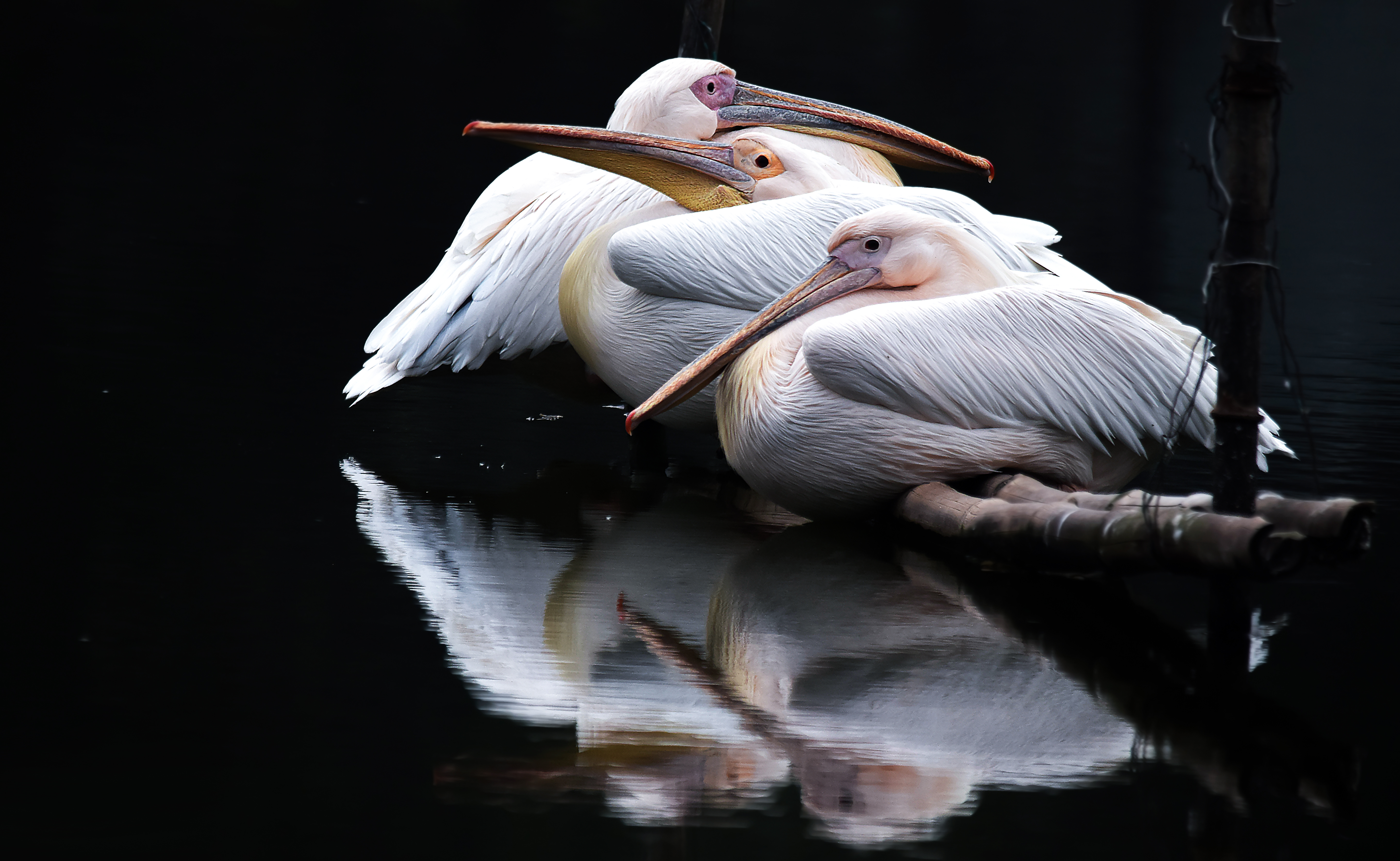
Pelicans at National Zoo, Bangladesh

Pelicans will frequent inland waterways but are most known for residing along maritime and coastal zones, where they feed principally on fish in their large throat pouches, diving into the water and catching them at/near the water's surface. They can adapt to varying degrees of water salinity, from freshwater and brackish to—most commonly—seawater. They are gregarious birds, travelling in flocks, hunting cooperatively, and breeding colonially. Four white-plumaged species tend to nest on the ground, and four brown or grey-plumaged species nest mainly in trees. The relationship between pelicans and people has often been contentious. The birds have been persecuted because of their perceived competition with commercial and recreational fishing. Their populations have fallen through habitat destruction, disturbance, and environmental pollution, and three species are of conservation concern. They also have a long history of cultural significance in mythology, and in Christian and heraldic iconography.

== Taxonomy and systematics ==
=== Etymology ===
The name comes from the Ancient Greek word pelekan (πελεκάν), which is itself derived from the word pelekys (πέλεκυς) meaning "axe". In classical times, the word was applied to both the pelican and the woodpecker.

=== Taxonomy history ===
The genus Pelecanus was first formally described by Carl Linnaeus in his landmark 1758 10th edition of Systema Naturae. He described the distinguishing characteristics as a straight bill hooked at the tip, linear nostrils, a bare face, and fully webbed feet. This early definition included frigatebirds, cormorants, and sulids, as well as pelicans. The family Pelecanidae was later introduced (as Pelicanea) by the French polymath Constantine Samuel Rafinesque in 1815.

=== Order and related taxa ===
Pelicans give their name to the Pelecaniformes, an order which has undergone significant revision. Tropicbirds (now Phaethontiformes), darters, cormorants, gannets, boobies, and frigatebirds (now Suliformes), all traditional members of the order, have since been removed from Pelecaniformes. In their place, herons, ibises, spoonbills, the hamerkop, and the shoebill have now been added into the Pelecaniformes.

=== Phylogenetic relationships ===
Molecular data support a close relationship between pelicans, shoebills (Balaeniceps rex), and hamerkops (Scopus umbretta). Together, they form a distinct clade within Pelecaniformes, although their precise evolutionary relationships remain under study.

- - Suliformes
  - Pelecaniformes
    - - Herons (Ardeidae)
      - Ibises and spoonbills (Threskiornithidae)
    - - - Hamerkop (Scopus umbretta)
        - Shoebill (Balaeniceps rex)
      - Pelicans (Pelecanus)

Cladogram based on Hackett et al. (2008).

Closest living relatives

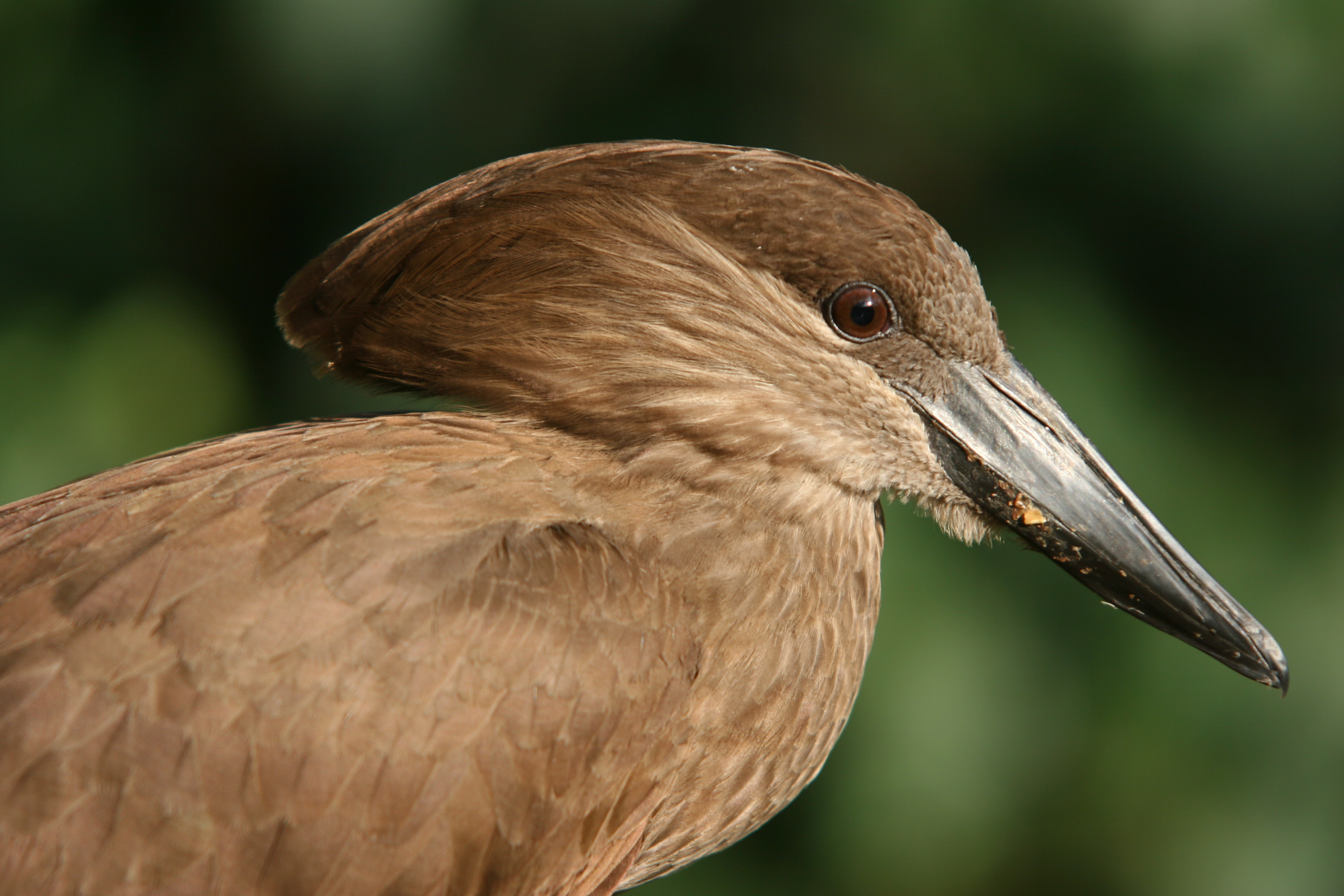
Hamerkop

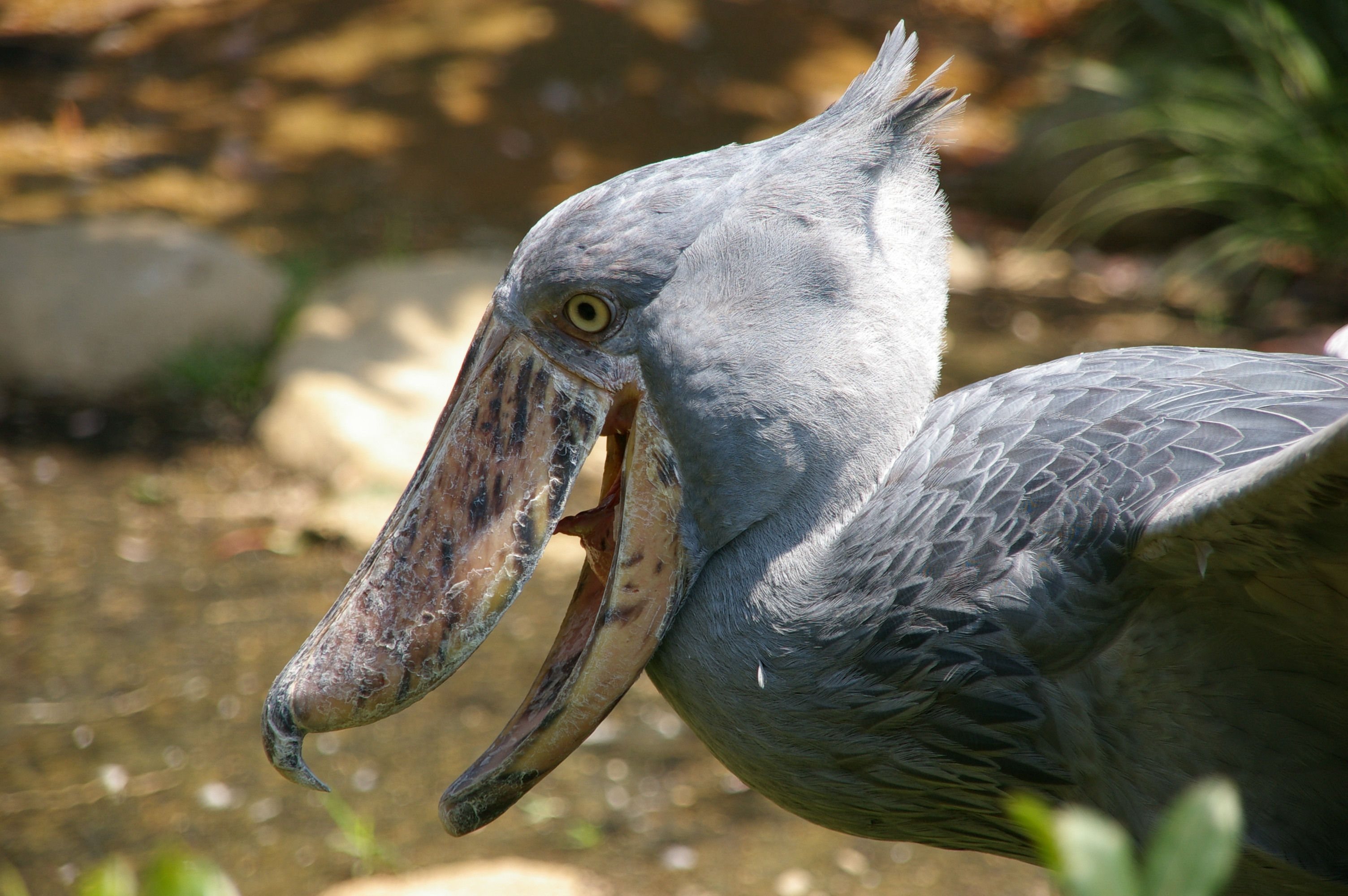
Shoebill

=== Evolution and fossil record ===
In 2021, a team from the University of Michigan published a paper on an avian tibiotarsus from the late Eocene (Priabonian) excavated from the Birket Qarun Formation in the Wadi El Hitan in Egypt (~36 million years ago). According to the researchers, the fossil bone shows striking similarities with that of modern species of pelican, leading them to conclude it was an early or ancestral pelican, which they dubbed Eopelecanus aegyptiacus.

Later fossils from the Early Miocene found at Luberon, France, include Pelecanus sp. and Miopelecanus gracilis. (Note: Once thought distinct but now considerted within Pelecanus variation.) Both fossils show a beak nearly morphologically identical to that of present-day pelicans. This remarkable stasis in pelican beak morphology may reflect strong functional constraints. Their specialized fish-eating beak has likely remained optimal over millions of years, with changes potentially reducing feeding efficiency. Some have also suggested that constraints imposed by flight may have limited the skeletal evolution of pelicans.

Notable fossil species (sorted by region and age) include:

- Europe: P. fraasi, Lydekker, 1891; P. intermedius, (Note: Pelecanus intermedius was transferred to Miopelecanus by Cheneval in 1984) Frass,1870; P. gracilis, Milne-Edwards, 1863; P. odessanus, Widhalm, 1886
- North America: P. halieus, Wetmore, 1933; P. schreiberi, Olson, 1999
- Asia: P. cautleyi, Davies, 1880; P. sivalensis, Davies, 1880
- South America: P. paranensis, Noriega et al., 2023
- Australia: P. cadimurka, Rich & van Tets, 1981; P. tirarensis, Miller, 1966

==== Controversial and dubious fossil assignments ====
- Protopelicanus (Late Eocene) – Once considered a possible early pelecaniform, this bird might instead belong to the Pelagornithidae (pseudotooth birds) or another unrelated aquatic lineage. It is not generally accepted as a member of Pelecanidae.
- Liptornis (Miocene) – Originally described as a pelican, this genus is now considered a nomen dubium, based on fragmentary material that lacks sufficient diagnostic features.

=== Extant species and phylogeny ===
==== Species overview ====
- - - - - - P. rufescens
          - P. philippensis
        - P. crispus
      - P. conspicillatus
    - P. onocrotalus
  - - - P. occidentalis
      - P. thagus
    - P. erythrorhynchos

Evolutionary relationships among the extant species based on Kennedy et al. (2013).

There are eight extant species of pelicans, which were historically divided into two groups based on plumage colouration and nesting behavior. One group includes four ground-nesting species with predominantly white plumage—the Australian, Dalmatian, great white, and American white pelicans. The other group consists of four species with grey or brown plumage that nest either in trees or on coastal rocks—the pink-backed, spot-billed, brown, and Peruvian pelicans. The largely marine brown and Peruvian pelicans, once considered conspecific, are sometimes placed in the subgenus Leptopelecanus due to their darker colouration and coastal habits. However, species with similar plumage and nesting behavior are found in both groups, indicating that these traits do not reflect deep evolutionary divisions.

Genetic analyses using mitochondrial and nuclear DNA have revealed a different picture of pelican relationships. These studies support the existence of two major clades: a New World clade, comprising the American white, brown, and Peruvian pelicans, and an Old World clade that includes the Dalmatian, pink-backed, spot-billed, Australian, and great white pelicans. This phylogeny suggests that pelicans evolved in the Old World and later colonized the Americas. Furthermore, it indicates that nesting behavior is more strongly influenced by body size than by genetic lineage.

==== List of living species ====
Living species of Pelecanus
Common and binomial names	Image	Description	Range and status
American white pelican Pelecanus erythrorhynchos Gmelin, 1789	American white pelican	Length 1.3–1.8 m (4.3–5.9 ft), wingspan 2.44–2.9 m (8.0–9.5 ft), weight 5–9 kg (10–20 lb). Plumage almost entirely white, except for black primary and secondary remiges only visible in flight.	Monotypic. Breeds in inland Canada and United States, wintering in southern United States, Mexico and Central America. Status: least concern.
Brown pelican Pelecanus occidentalis Linnaeus, 1766	Brown pelican	Length up to 1.4 m (4.6 ft), wingspan 2–2.3 m (6.6–7.5 ft), weight 3.6–4.5 kg (7.9–9.9 lb). Smallest pelican; distinguished by brown plumage; feeds by plunge-diving.	Five subspecies. Coastal distribution ranging from North America and the Caribbean to northern South America and the Galapagos. Status: least concern.
Peruvian pelican Pelecanus thagus Molina, 1782	Peruvian pelican	Length up to 1.52 m (5.0 ft), wingspan 2.48 m (8.1 ft), average weight 7 kg (15 lb). Dark with a white stripe from the crown down the sides of the neck.	Monotypic. Pacific Coast of South America from Ecuador and Peru south through to southern Chile. Status: near threatened.
Great white pelican Pelecanus onocrotalus Linnaeus, 1758	Great white pelican	Length 1.40–1.75 m (4.6–5.7 ft), wingspan 2.45–2.95 m (8.0–9.7 ft), weight 10–11 kg (22–24 lb). Plumage white, with pink facial patch and legs.	Monotypic. Patchy distribution from eastern Mediterranean east to Indochina and Malay Peninsula, and south to South Africa. Status: least concern.
Australian pelican Pelecanus conspicillatus Temminck, 1824	Australian pelican	Length 1.60–1.90 m (5.2–6.2 ft), wingspan 2.3–2.5 m (7.5–8.2 ft), weight 4–8.2 kg (8.8–18.1 lb). Predominantly white with black along primaries and very large, pale pink bill.	Monotypic. Australia and New Guinea; vagrant to New Zealand, Solomons, Bismarck Archipelago, Fiji and Wallacea. Status: least concern.
Pink-backed pelican Pelecanus rufescens Gmelin, 1789	Pink-backed pelican	Length 1.25–1.32 m (4.1–4.3 ft), wingspan 2.65–2.9 m (8.7–9.5 ft), weight 3.9–7 kg (8.6–15.4 lb). Grey and white plumage, occasionally pinkish on the back, with a yellow upper mandible and grey pouch.	Monotypic. Africa, Seychelles and southwestern Arabia; extinct in Madagascar. Status: least concern.
Dalmatian pelican Pelecanus crispus Bruch, 1832	Dalmatian pelican	Length 1.60–1.80 m (5.2–5.9 ft), wingspan 2.70–3.20 m (8.9–10.5 ft), weight 10–12 kg (22–26 lb). Largest pelican; differs from great white pelican in having curly nape feathers, grey legs and greyish-white plumage.	Monotypic. South-eastern Europe to India and China. Status: near threatened.
Spot-billed pelican Pelecanus philippensis Gmelin, 1789	Spot-billed pelican	Length 1.27–1.52 m (4.2–5.0 ft), wingspan 2.5 m (8.2 ft), weight c. 5 kg (11 lb). Mainly grey-white all over, with a grey hindneck crest in breeding season, pinkish rump and spotted bill pouch.	Monotypic. Southern Asia from southern Pakistan across India east to Indonesia; extinct in the Philippines and possibly eastern China. Status: near threatened.

== Description ==
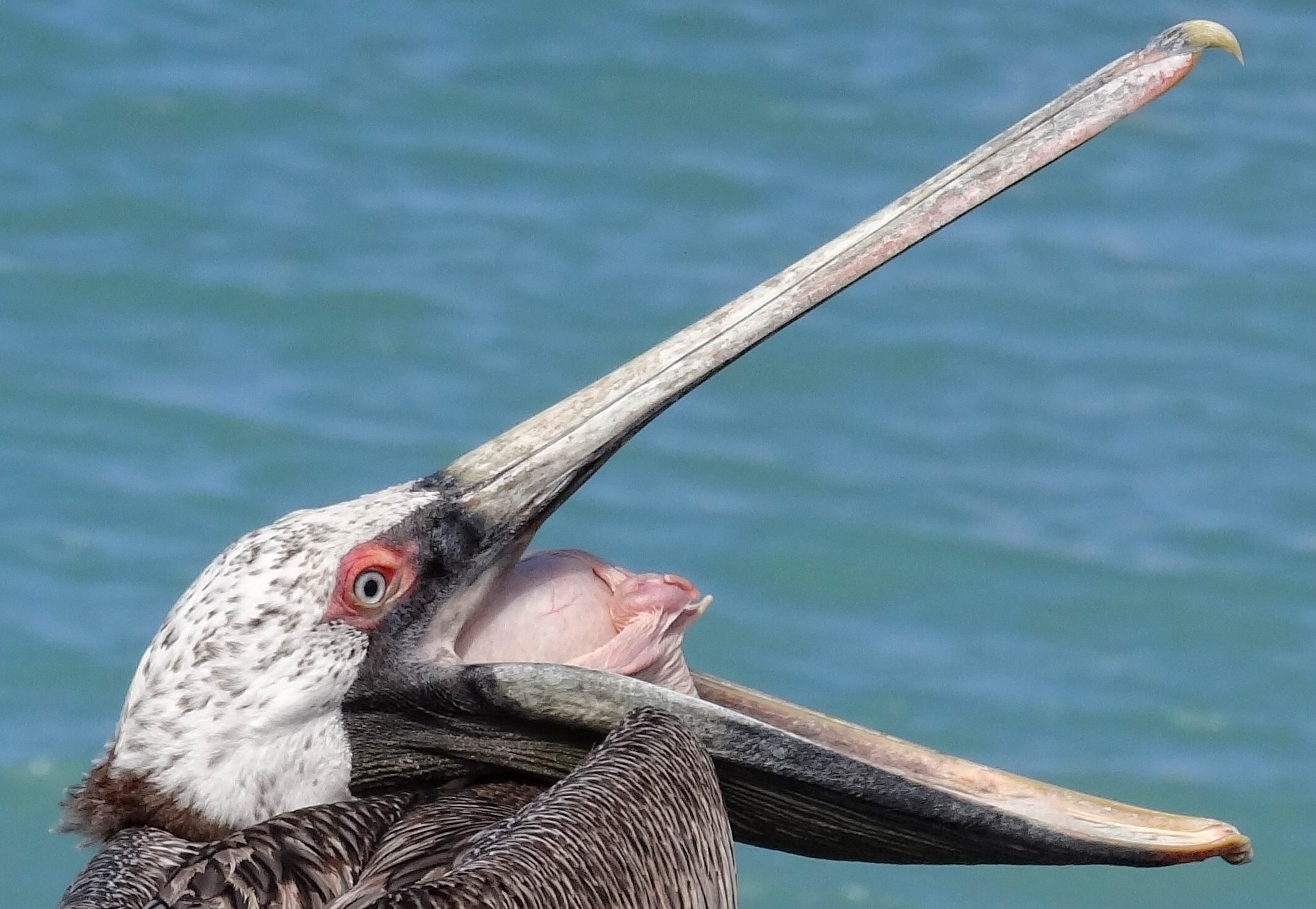
A brown pelican inverting its gular pouch.

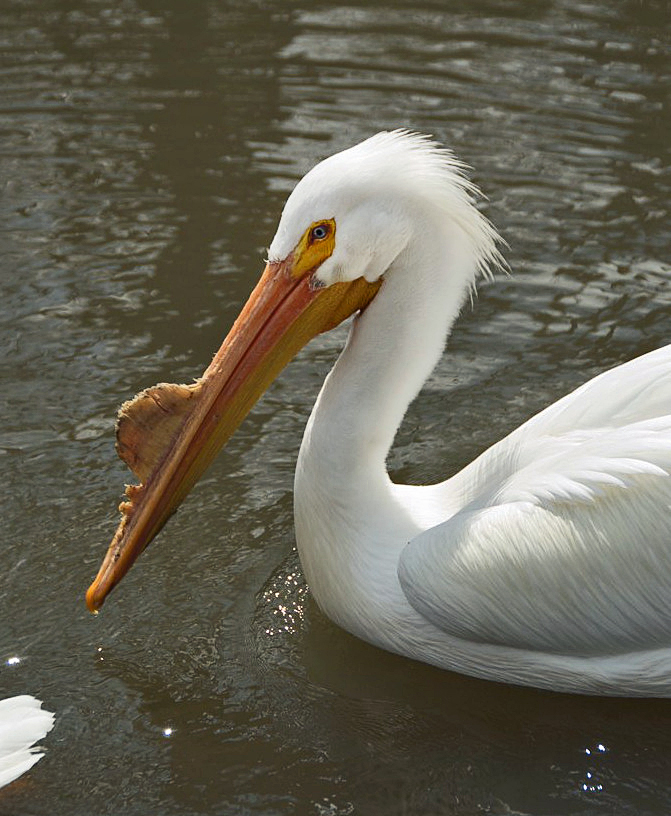
American white pelican. The knob on its bill develops before the breeding season.

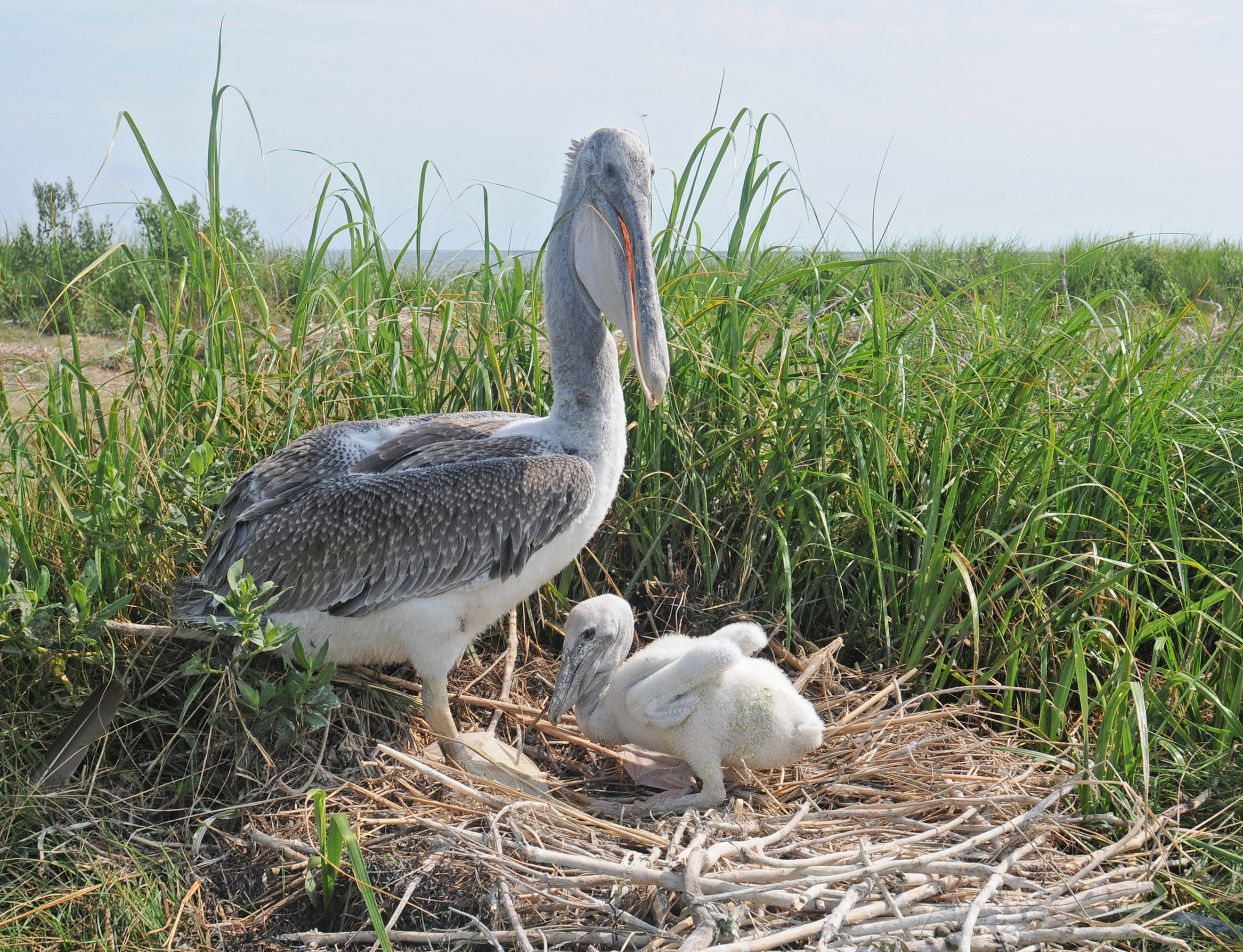
An adult brown pelican with a chick in a nest in Chesapeake Bay, Maryland, US. This species will nest on the ground when no suitable trees are available.

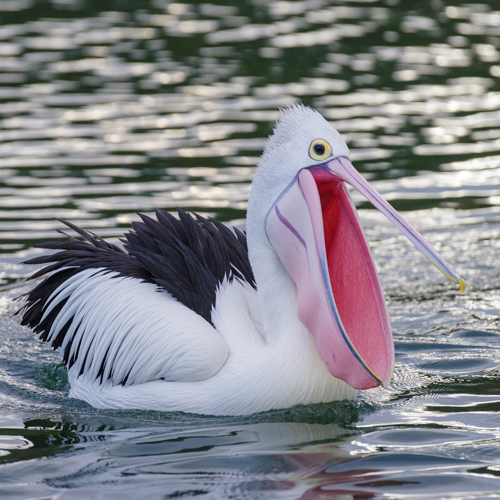
Australian pelican displaying the extent of its throat pouch (Lakes Entrance, Victoria)

Pelicans are very large birds with very long bills characterised by a downcurved hook at the end of the upper mandible, and the attachment of a huge gular pouch to the lower. The slender rami of the lower bill and the flexible tongue muscles form the pouch into a basket for catching fish, and sometimes rainwater, though to not hinder the swallowing of large fish, the tongue itself is tiny. They have a long neck and short stout legs with large, fully webbed feet. Although they are among the heaviest of flying birds, they are relatively light for their apparent bulk because of air pockets in the skeleton and beneath the skin, enabling them to float high in the water. The tail is short and square. The wings are long and broad, suitably shaped for soaring and gliding flight, and have the unusually large number of 30 to 35 secondary flight feathers.

Males are generally larger than females and have longer bills. The smallest species is the brown pelican, small individuals of which can be no more than 2.75 kg (6.1 lb) and 1.06 m (3.5 ft) long, with a wingspan of as little as 1.83 m (6.0 ft). The largest is believed to be the Dalmatian pelican, at up to 15 kg (33 lb) and 1.83 m (6.0 ft) in length, with a maximum wingspan of 3 m (9.8 ft). The Australian pelican's bill may grow up to 0.5 m (1.6 ft) long in large males, the longest of any bird.

Pelicans have mainly light-coloured plumage, the exceptions being the brown and Peruvian pelicans. The bills, pouches, and bare facial skin of all species become brighter before breeding season commences. The throat pouch of the Californian subspecies of the brown pelican turns bright red, and fades to yellow after the eggs are laid, while the throat pouch of the Peruvian pelican turns blue. The American white pelican grows a prominent knob on its bill that is shed once females have laid eggs. The plumage of immature pelicans is darker than that of adults. Newly hatched chicks are naked and pink, darkening to grey or black after four to 14 days, then developing a covering of white or grey down.

=== Air sacs ===
Anatomical dissections of two brown pelicans in 1939 showed that pelicans have a network of air sacs under their skin situated across the ventral surface including the throat, breast, and undersides of the wings, as well as having air sacs in their bones. The air sacs are connected to the airways of the respiratory system, and the pelican can keep its air sacs inflated by closing its glottis, but how air sacs are inflated is not clear. The air sacs serve to keep the pelican remarkably buoyant in the water and may also cushion the impact of the pelican's body on the water surface when they dive from flight into water to catch fish. Superficial air sacs may also help to round body contours (especially over the abdomen, where surface protuberances may be caused by viscera changing size and position) to enable the overlying feathers to form more effective heat insulation and also to enable feathers to be held in position for good aerodynamics.

== Distribution and habitat ==
Modern pelicans are found on all continents except Antarctica. They primarily inhabit warm regions, although breeding ranges extend to latitudes of 45° South (Australian pelicans in Tasmania) and 60° North (American white pelicans in western Canada). Birds of inland and coastal waters, they are absent from polar regions, the deep ocean, oceanic islands (except the Galapagos), and inland South America, as well as from the eastern coast of South America from the mouth of the Amazon River southwards. Subfossil bones have been recovered from as far south as New Zealand's South Island, although their scarcity and isolated occurrence suggests that these remains may have merely been vagrants from Australia (much as is the case today).

== Behaviour and ecology ==
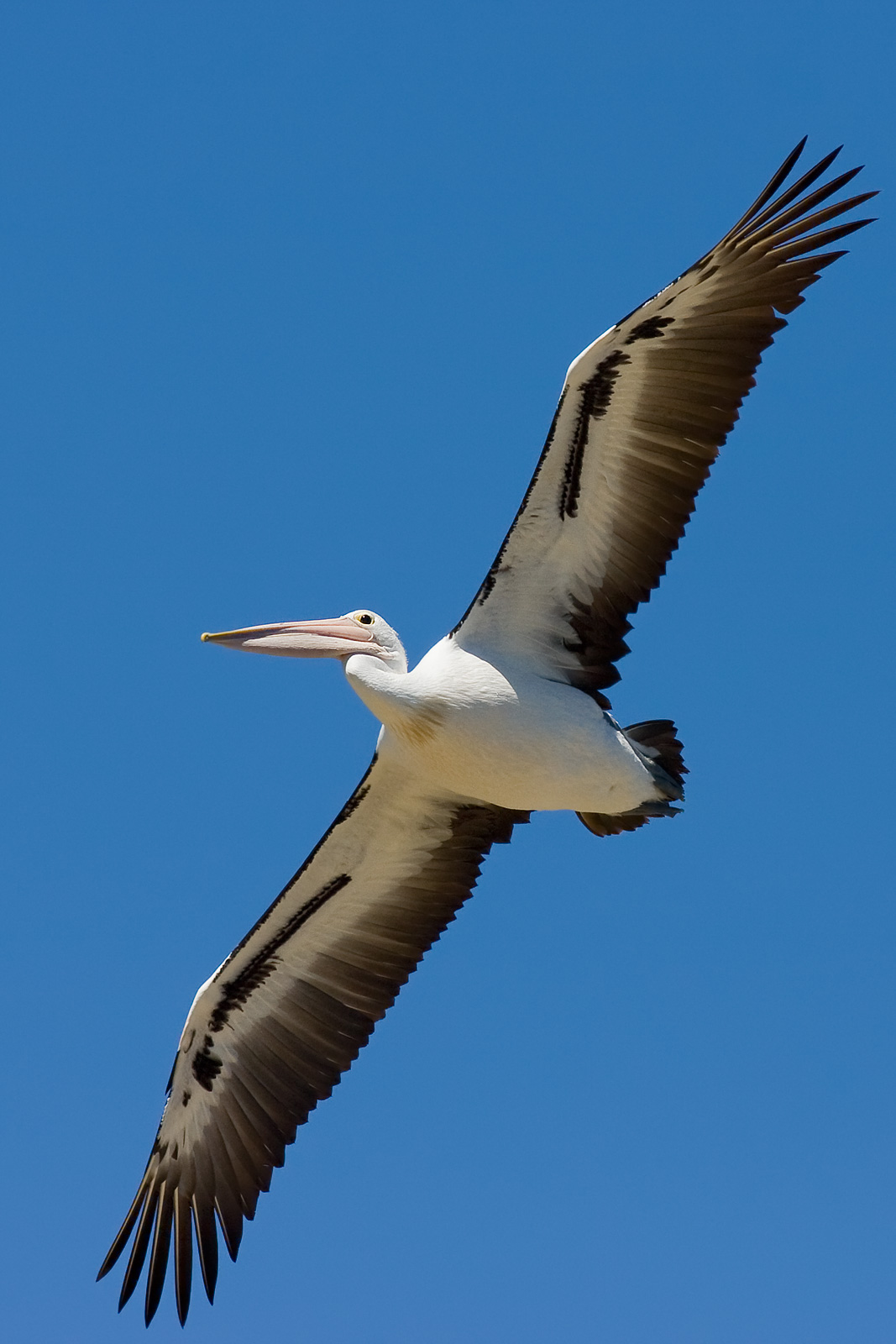
An Australian pelican gliding with its large wings extended

Pelicans swim well with their strong legs and their webbed feet. They rub the backs of their heads on their preen glands to pick up an oily secretion, which they transfer to their plumage to waterproof it. Holding their wings only loosely against their bodies, pelicans float with relatively little of their bodies below the water surface. They dissipate excess heat by gular flutter – rippling the skin of the throat and pouch with the bill open to promote evaporative cooling. They roost and loaf communally on beaches, sandbanks, and in shallow water.

A fibrous layer deep in the breast muscles can hold the wings rigidly horizontal for gliding and soaring. Thus, they use thermals for soaring to heights of 3,000 m (10,000 ft) or more, combined both with gliding and with flapping flight in V formation, to commute distances up to 150 km (93 mi) to feeding areas. Pelicans also fly low (or "skim") over stretches of water, using a phenomenon known as ground effect to reduce drag and increase lift. As the air flows between the wings and the water surface, it is compressed to a higher density and exerts a stronger upward force against the bird above. Hence, substantial energy is saved while flying.

Adult pelicans rely on visual displays and behaviour to communicate, particularly using their wings and bills. Agonistic behaviour consists of thrusting and snapping at opponents with their bills, or lifting and waving their wings in a threatening manner. Adult pelicans grunt when at the colony, but are generally silent elsewhere or outside breeding season. Conversely, colonies are noisy, as chicks vocalise extensively.

=== Breeding and lifespan ===
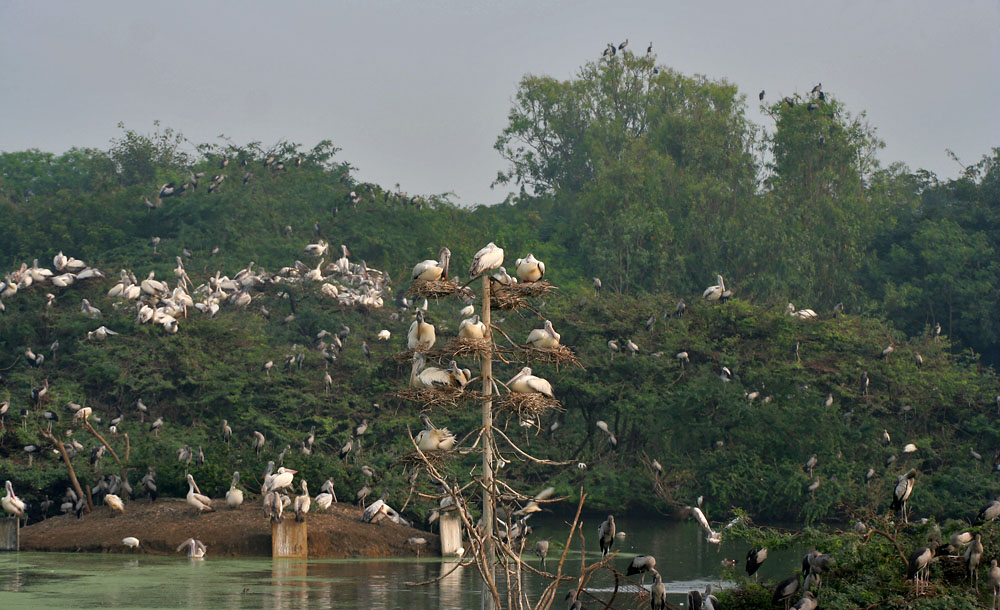
A spot-billed pelican nesting colony at Uppalapadu, India: This species builds nests in trees.

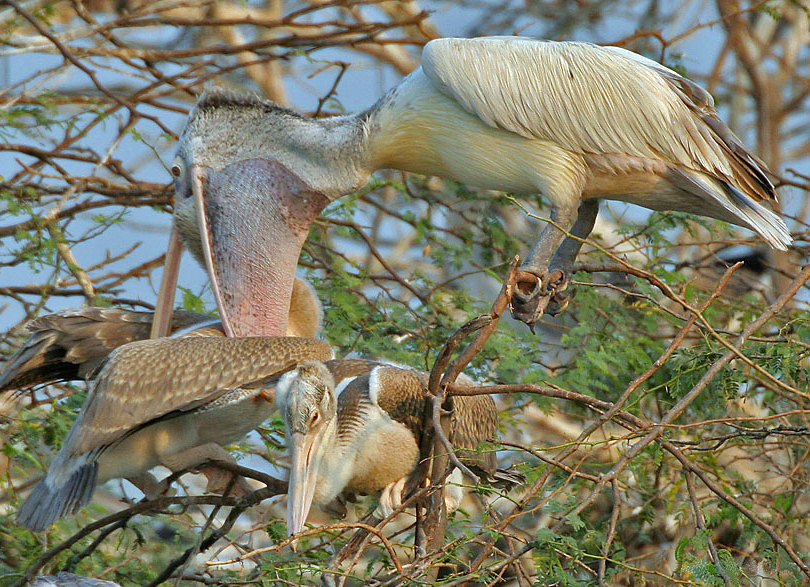
A spot-billed pelican feeding a juvenile in a nest in a tree at Garapadu, India

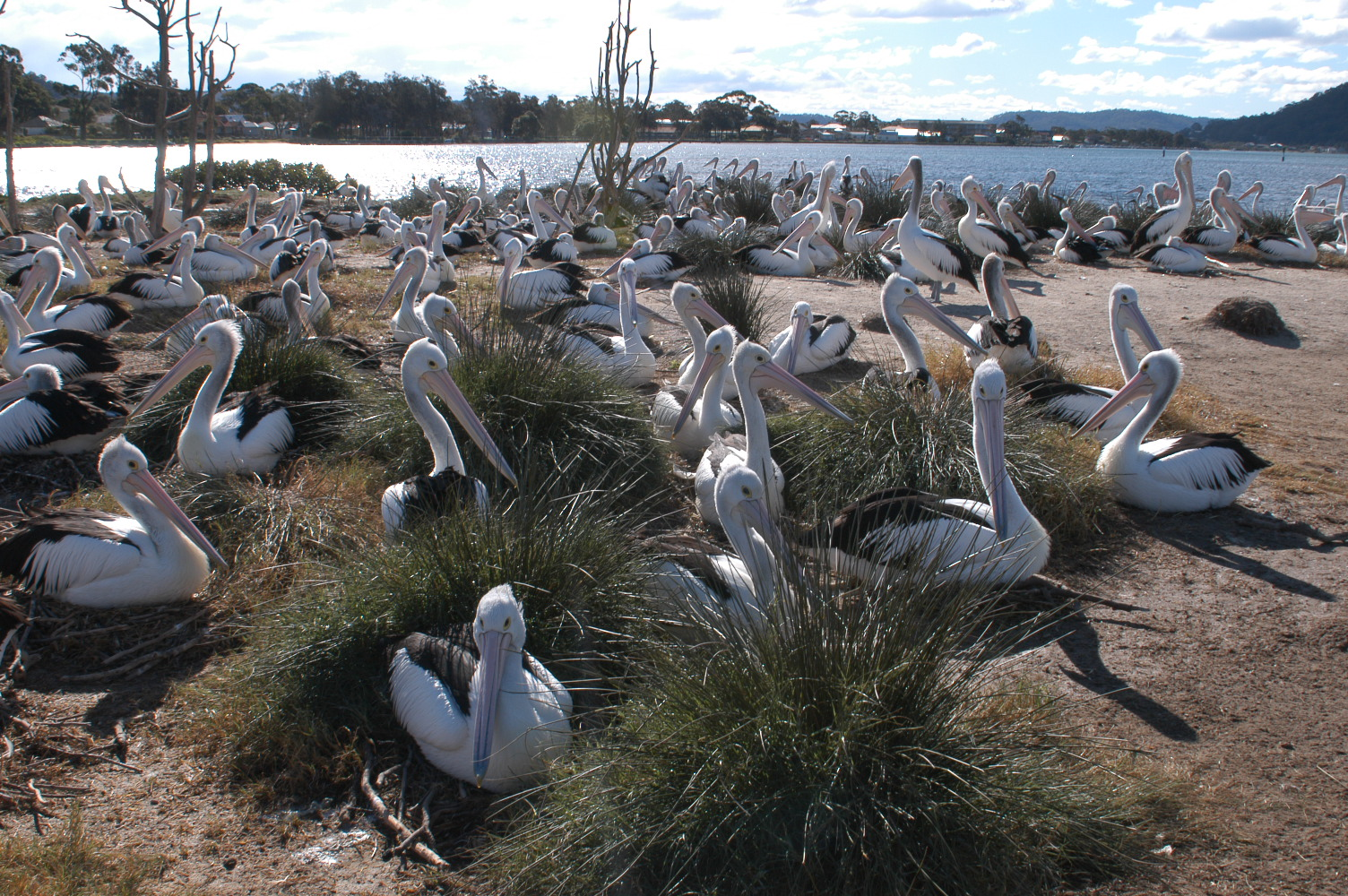
A nesting colony of Australian pelicans on the coast of New South Wales, Australia.

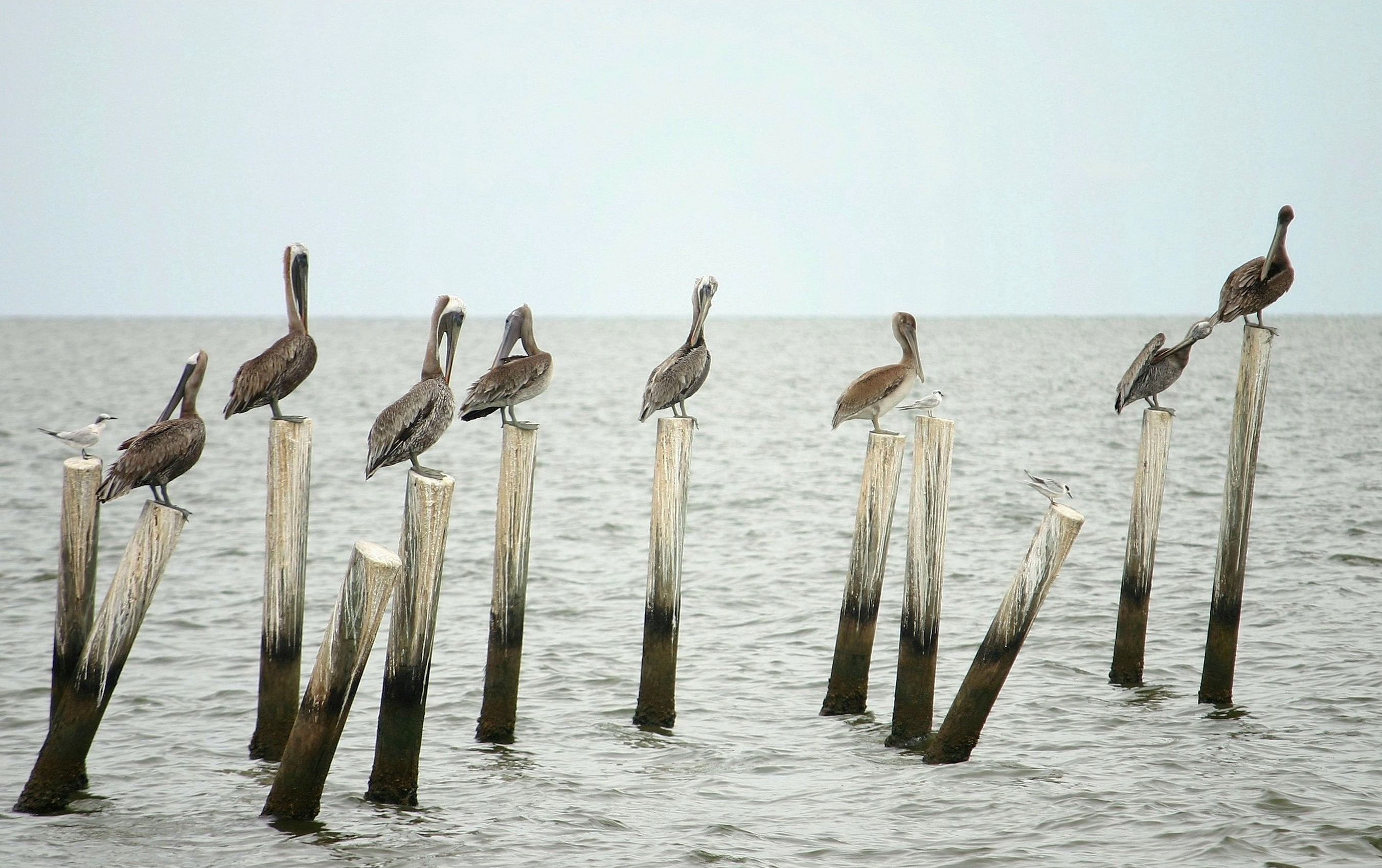
Pelicans at Dauphin Island, Alabama, United States

Pelicans are gregarious and nest colonially. Pairs are monogamous for a single season, but the pair bond extends only to the nesting area; mates are independent away from the nest. The ground-nesting (white) species have a complex communal courtship involving a group of males chasing a single female in the air, on land, or in the water while pointing, gaping, and thrusting their bills at each other. They can finish the process in a day. The tree-nesting species have a simpler process in which perched males advertise for females. The location of the breeding colony is constrained by the availability of an ample supply of fish to eat, although pelicans can use thermals to soar and commute for hundreds of kilometres daily to fetch food.

The Australian pelican has two reproductive strategies depending on the local degree of environmental predictability. Colonies of tens or hundreds, rarely thousands, of birds breed regularly on small coastal and subcoastal islands where food is seasonally or permanently available. In arid inland Australia, especially in the endorheic Lake Eyre basin, pelicans breed opportunistically in very large numbers of up to 50,000 pairs, when irregular major floods, which may be many years apart, fill ephemeral salt lakes and provide large amounts of food for several months before drying out again.

In all species, copulation takes place at the nest site; it begins shortly after pairing and continues for three to ten days before egg-laying. The male brings the nesting material, in ground-nesting species (which may not build a nest) sometimes in the pouch, and in tree-nesting species crosswise in the bill. The female then heaps the material up to form a simple structure.

The eggs are oval, white, and coarsely textured. All species normally lay at least two eggs; the usual clutch size is one to three, rarely up to six. Both sexes incubate with the eggs on top of or below the feet; they may display when changing shifts. Incubation takes 30–36 days; hatching success for undisturbed pairs can be as high as 95%, but because of sibling competition or siblicide, in the wild, usually all but one nestling dies within the first few weeks (later in the pink-backed and spot-billed species). Both parents feed their young. Small chicks are fed by regurgitation; after about a week, they are able to put their heads into their parents' pouches and feed themselves. Sometimes before, but especially after being fed the pelican chick may seem to "throw a tantrum" by loudly vocalizing and dragging itself around in a circle by one wing and leg, striking its head on the ground or anything nearby and the tantrums sometimes end in what looks like a seizure that results in the chick falling briefly unconscious; the reason is not clearly known, but a common belief is that it is to draw attention to itself and away from any siblings who are waiting to be fed.

Parents of ground-nesting species sometimes drag older young around roughly by the head before feeding them. From about 25 days old, the young of these species gather in "pods" or "crèches" of up to 100 birds in which parents recognise and feed only their own offspring. By six to eight weeks, they wander around, occasionally swimming, and may practise communal feeding. Young of all species fledge ten to 12 weeks after hatching. They may remain with their parents afterwards, but are now seldom or never fed. They are mature at three or four years old. Overall breeding success is highly variable. Pelicans live for 15 to 25 years in the wild, although one reached an age of 54 years in captivity.

=== Feeding ===
The diet of pelicans usually consists of fish, but occasionally amphibians, turtles, crustaceans, insects, birds, and mammals are also eaten. The size of the preferred prey fish varies depending on pelican species and location. For example, in Africa, the pink-backed pelican generally takes fish ranging in size from fry up to 400 g (0.9 lb) and the great white pelican prefers somewhat larger fish, up to 600 g (1.3 lb), but in Europe, the latter species has been recorded taking fish up to 1,850 g (4.1 lb). In deep water, white pelicans often fish alone. Nearer the shore, several encircle schools of small fish or form a line to drive them into the shallows, beating their wings on the water surface and then scooping up the prey. Although all pelican species may feed in groups or alone, the Dalmatian, pink-backed, and spot-billed pelicans are the only ones to prefer solitary feeding. When fishing in groups, all pelican species have been known to work together to catch their prey, and Dalmatian pelicans may even cooperate with great cormorants.

Brown pelicans diving into the sea to catch fish in Jamaica

Large fish are caught with the bill-tip, then tossed up in the air to be caught and slid into the gullet head-first. A gull will sometimes stand on the pelican's head, peck it to distraction, and grab a fish from the open bill. Pelicans in their turn sometimes snatch prey from other waterbirds.

The brown pelican usually plunge-dives head-first for its prey, from a height as great as 10–20 m (33–66 ft), especially for anchovies and menhaden. The only other pelican to feed using a similar technique is the Peruvian pelican, but its dives are typically from a lower height than the brown pelican. The Australian and American white pelicans may feed by low plunge-dives landing feet-first and then scooping up the prey with the beak, but they—as well as the remaining pelican species—primarily feed while swimming on the water. Aquatic prey is most commonly taken at or near the water surface. Although principally a fish eater, the Australian pelican is also an eclectic and opportunistic scavenger and carnivore that forages in landfill sites, as well as taking carrion and "anything from insects and small crustaceans to ducks and small dogs". Food is not stored in a pelican's throat pouch, contrary to popular folklore.

Pelicans may also eat birds. In southern Africa, eggs and chicks of the Cape cormorant are an important food source for great white pelicans. Several other bird species have been recorded in the diet of this pelican in South Africa, including Cape gannet chicks on Malgas Island as well as crowned cormorants, kelp gulls, greater crested terns, and African penguins on Dassen Island and elsewhere. The Australian pelican, which is particularly willing to take a wide range of prey items, has been recorded feeding on young Australian white ibis, and young and adult grey teals and silver gulls. Brown pelicans have been reported preying on young common murres in California and the eggs and nestlings of cattle egrets and nestling great egrets in Baja California, Mexico. Peruvian pelicans in Chile have been recorded feeding on nestlings of imperial shags, juvenile Peruvian diving petrels, and grey gulls. Cannibalism of chicks of their own species is known from the Australian, brown, and Peruvian pelicans. Non-native great white pelicans have been observed swallowing city pigeons in St. James's Park in London, England.

== Status and conservation ==
=== Populations ===
Globally, pelican populations are adversely affected by these main factors: declining supplies of fish through overfishing or water pollution, destruction of habitat, direct effects of human activity such as disturbance at nesting colonies, hunting and culling, entanglement in fishing lines and hooks, and the presence of pollutants such as DDT and endrin. Most species' populations are more or less stable, although three are classified by the IUCN as being at risk. All species breed readily in zoos, which is potentially useful for conservation management.

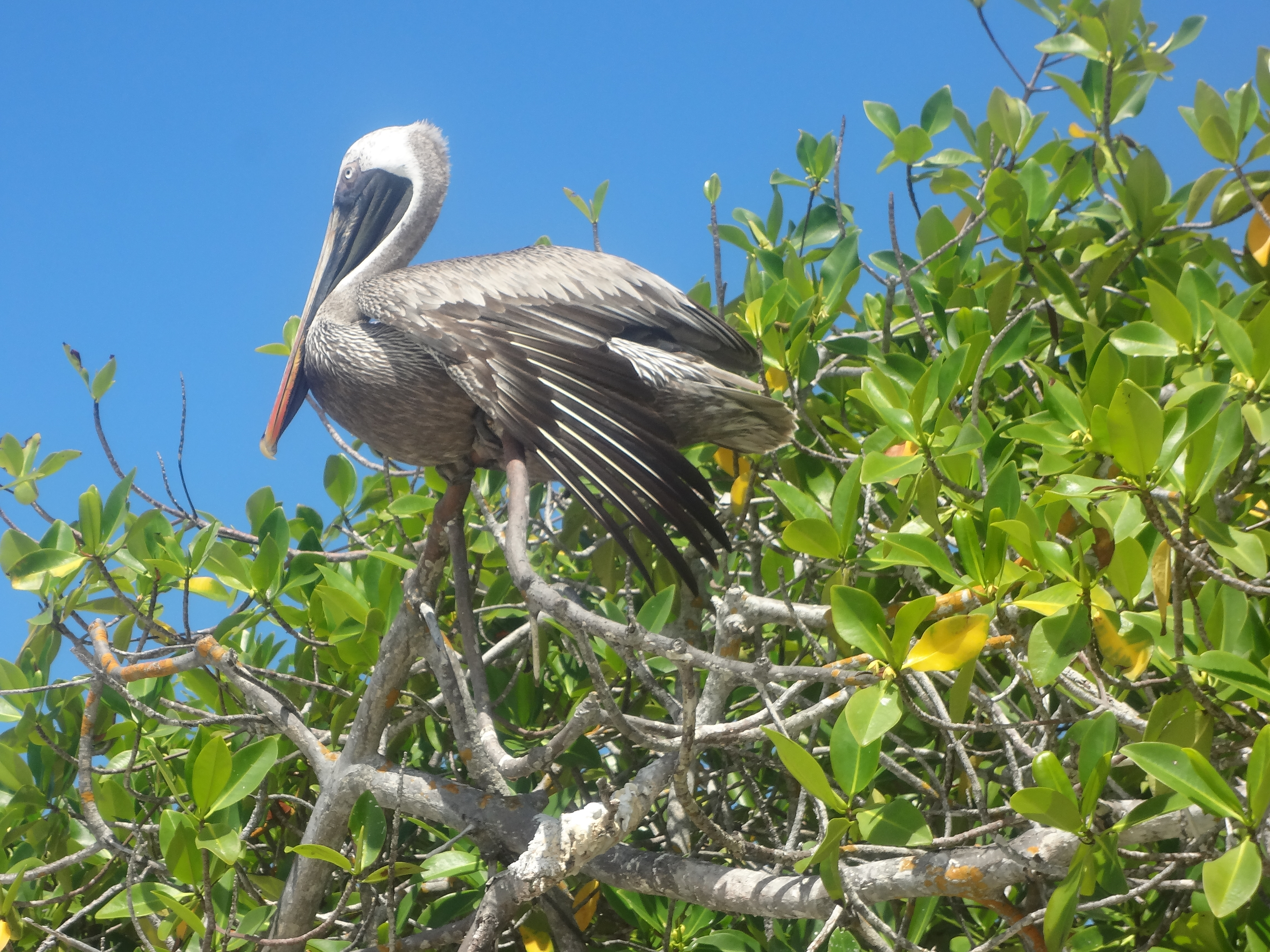
Pelecanus occidentalis, Tortuga Bay, Island of Santa Cruz, Galápagos

The combined population of brown and Peruvian pelicans is estimated at 650,000 birds, with around 250,000 in the United States and Caribbean, and 400,000 in Peru. (Note: The US government has not accepted the elevation of the two taxa into separate species.) The National Audubon Society estimates the global population of the brown pelican at 300,000. Numbers of brown pelican plummeted in the 1950s and 1960s, largely as a consequence of environmental DDT pollution, and the species was listed as endangered in the US in 1970. With restrictions on DDT use in the US from 1972, its population has recovered, and it was delisted in 2009.

The Peruvian pelican is listed as near threatened because, although the population is estimated by BirdLife International to exceed 500,000 mature individuals, and is possibly increasing, it has been much higher in the past. It declined dramatically during the 1998 El Niño event and could experience similar declines in the future. Conservation needs include regular monitoring throughout the range to determine population trends, particularly after El Niño years, restricting human access to important breeding colonies, and assessing interactions with fisheries.

The spot-billed pelican has an estimated population between 13,000 and 18,000 and is considered to be near threatened in the IUCN Red List of Threatened Species. Numbers declined substantially during the 20th century, one crucial factor being the eradication of the important Sittaung valley breeding colony in Burma through deforestation and the loss of feeding sites. The chief threats it faces are from habitat loss and human disturbance, but populations have mostly stabilised following increased protection in India and Cambodia.

The pink-backed pelican has a large population ranging over much of sub-Saharan Africa. In the absence of substantial threats or evidence of declines across its range, its conservation status is assessed as being of least concern. Regional threats include the drainage of wetlands and increasing disturbance in southern Africa. The species is susceptible to bioaccumulation of toxins and the destruction of nesting trees by logging.

The American white pelican has increased in numbers, with its population estimated at over 157,000 birds in 2005, becoming more numerous east of the continental divide, while declining in the west. However, whether its numbers have been affected by exposure to pesticides is unclear, as it has also lost habitat through wetland drainage and competition with recreational use of lakes and rivers.

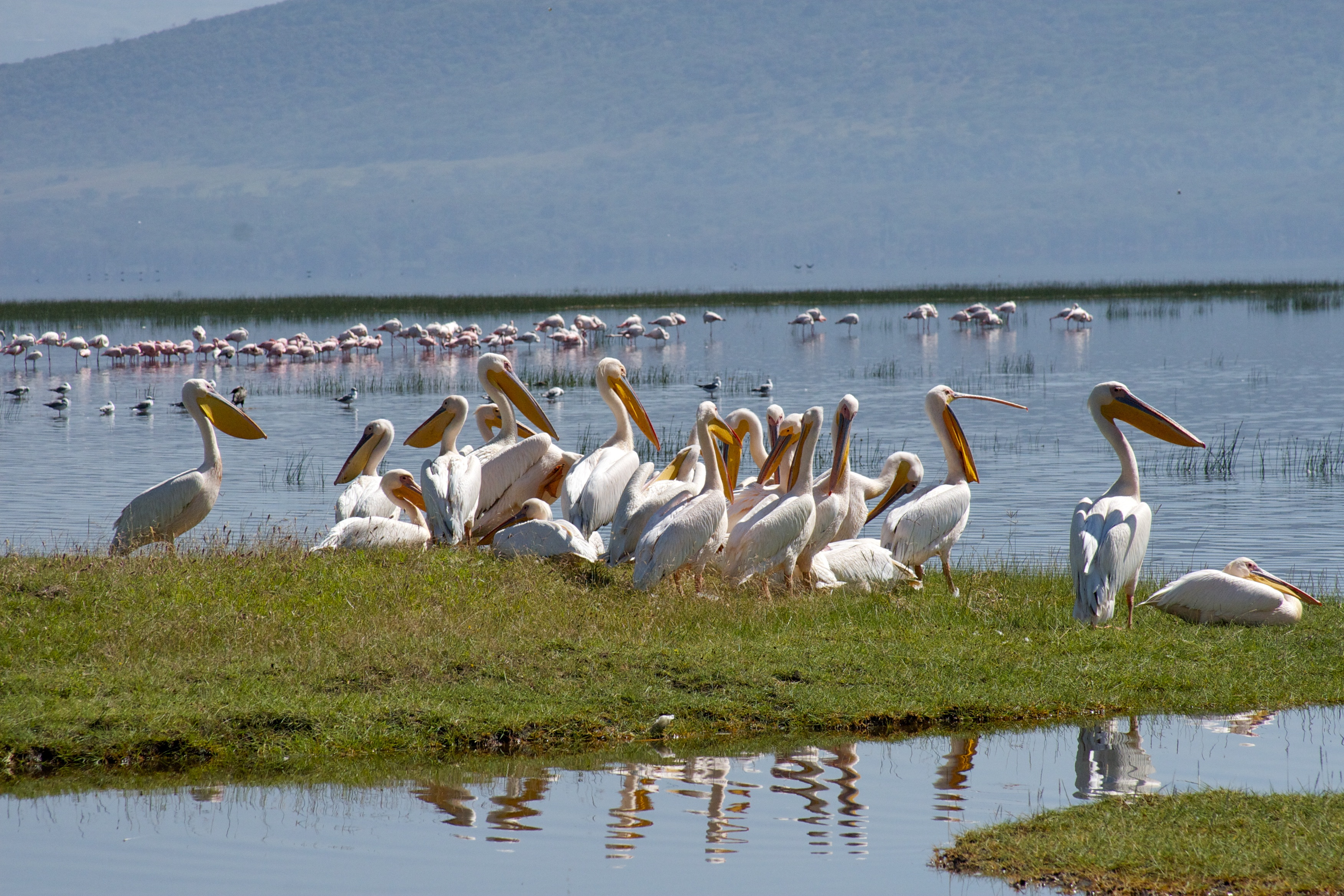
Great white pelicans loafing in Kenya

Great white pelicans range over a large area of Africa and southern Asia. The overall trend in numbers is uncertain, with a mix of regional populations that are increasing, declining, stable, or unknown, but no evidence has been found of rapid overall decline, and the status of the species is assessed as being of least concern. Threats include the drainage of wetlands, persecution and sport hunting, disturbance at the breeding colonies, and contamination by pesticides and heavy metals.

The Dalmatian pelican has a population estimated at between 10,000 and 20,000 following massive declines in the 19th and 20th centuries. The main ongoing threats include hunting, especially in eastern Asia, disturbance, coastal development, collision with overhead power lines, and the over-exploitation of fish stocks. It is listed as near threatened by the IUCN Red List of Threatened Species as the population trend is downwards, especially in Mongolia, where it is nearly extinct. However, several European colonies are increasing in size and the largest colony for the species, at the Small Prespa Lake in Greece, has reached about 1,400 breeding pairs following conservation measures.

Widespread across Australia, the Australian pelican has a population generally estimated at between 300,000 and 500,000 individuals. Overall population numbers fluctuate widely and erratically depending on wetland conditions and breeding success across the continent. The species is assessed as being of least concern.

=== Culling and disturbance ===
Pelicans have been persecuted by humans for their perceived competition for fish, despite the fact that their diet overlaps little with fish caught by people. Starting in the 1880s, American white pelicans were clubbed and shot, their eggs and young were deliberately destroyed, and their feeding and nesting sites were degraded by water management schemes and wetland drainage. Even in the 21st century, an increase in the population of American white pelicans in southeastern Idaho in the US was seen to threaten the recreational cutthroat trout fishery there, leading to official attempts to reduce pelican numbers through systematic harassment and culling.

Great white pelicans on Dyer Island, in the Western Cape region of South Africa, were culled during the 19th century because their predation of the eggs and chicks of guano-producing seabirds was seen to threaten the livelihood of the guano collectors. More recently, such predation at South African seabird colonies has impacted on the conservation of threatened seabird populations, especially crowned cormorants, Cape cormorants, and bank cormorants. This has led to suggestions that pelican numbers should be controlled at vulnerable colonies.

Apart from habitat destruction and deliberate, targeted persecution, pelicans are vulnerable to disturbance at their breeding colonies by birdwatchers, photographers, and other curious visitors. Human presence alone can cause the birds to accidentally displace or destroy their eggs, leave hatchlings exposed to predators and adverse weather, or even abandon their colonies completely.

=== Poisoning and pollution ===
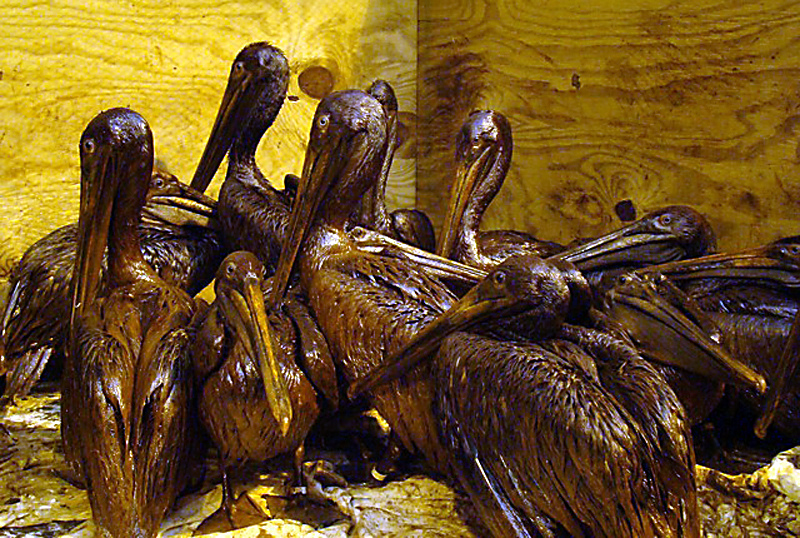
Brown pelicans, covered with oil, after the Deepwater Horizon oil spill of 2010

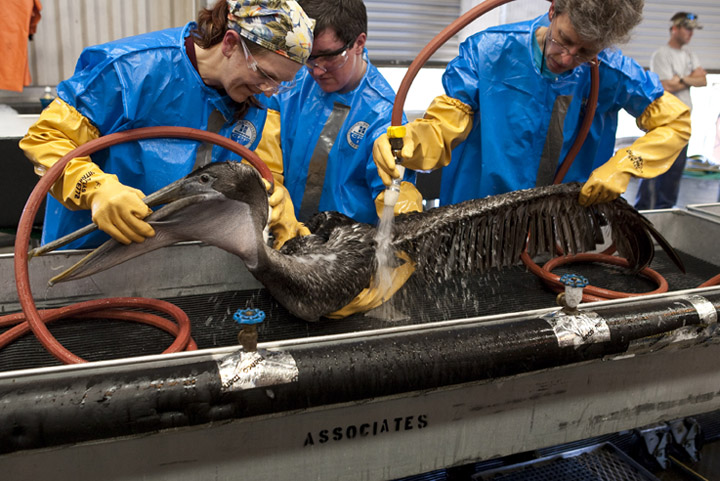
Oiled brown pelican being washed at a rescue center in Fort Jackson, 2010

DDT pollution in the environment was a major cause of decline of brown pelican populations in North America in the 1950s and 1960s. It entered the oceanic food web, contaminating and accumulating in several species, including one of the pelican's primary food fish – the northern anchovy. Its metabolite DDE is a reproductive toxicant in pelicans and many other birds, causing eggshell thinning and weakening, and consequent breeding failure through the eggs being accidentally crushed by brooding birds. Since an effective ban on the use of DDT was implemented in the US in 1972, the eggshells of breeding brown pelicans there have thickened and their populations have largely recovered.

In the late 1960s, following the major decline in brown pelican numbers in Louisiana from DDT poisoning, 500 pelicans were imported from Florida to augment and re-establish the population; over 300 subsequently died in April and May 1975 from poisoning by the pesticide endrin. About 14,000 pelicans, including 7,500 American white pelicans, perished from botulism after eating fish from the Salton Sea in 1990. In 1991, abnormal numbers of brown pelicans and Brandt's cormorants died at Santa Cruz, California, when their food fish (anchovies) were contaminated with neurotoxic domoic acid, produced by the diatom Pseudo-nitzschia.

As waterbirds that feed on fish, pelicans are highly susceptible to oil spills, both directly by being oiled and by the impact on their food resources. A 2007 report to the California Fish and Game Commission estimated that during the previous 20 years, some 500–1,000 brown pelicans had been affected by oil spills in California. A 2011 report by the Center for Biological Diversity, a year after the April 2010 Deepwater Horizon oil spill, said that 932 brown pelicans had been collected after being affected by oiling and estimated that ten times that number had been harmed as a result of the spill.

Where pelicans interact with fishers, through either sharing the same waters or scavenging for fishing refuse, they are especially vulnerable to being hooked and entangled in both active and discarded fishing lines. Fish hooks are swallowed or catch in the skin of the pouch or webbed feet, and strong monofilament fishing line can become wound around bill, wings, or legs, resulting in crippling, starvation, and often death. Local rescue organisations have been established in North America and Australia by volunteers to treat and rehabilitate injured pelicans and other wildlife.

=== Parasites and disease ===
As with other bird families, pelicans are susceptible to a variety of parasites. Avian malaria is carried by the mosquito Culex pipiens, and high densities of these biting insects may force pelican colonies to be abandoned. Leeches may attach to the vent or sometimes the inside of the pouch. A study of the parasites of the American white pelican found 75 different species, including tapeworms, flukes, flies, fleas, ticks, and nematodes.

The brown pelican has a similarly extensive range of parasites. The nematodes Contracaecum multipapillatum and C. mexicanum and the trematode Ribeiroia ondatrae have caused illness and mortality in the Puerto Rican population, possibly endangering the pelican on this island.

Many pelican parasites are found in other bird groups, but several lice are very host-specific. Healthy pelicans can usually cope with their lice, but sick birds may carry hundreds of individuals, which hastens a sick bird's demise. The pouch louse Piagetiella peralis occurs in the pouch and so it cannot be removed by preening. While this is usually not a serious problem even when present in such numbers that it covers the whole interior of the pouch, sometimes inflammation and bleeding may occur from it and harm the host.

In May 2012, hundreds of Peruvian pelicans were reported to have perished in Peru from a combination of starvation and roundworm infestation.

== Symbolism and cultural significance ==
The pelican has played a prominent symbolic role in human cultures across time and geography. From ancient Egypt to Indigenous Australia, and from Christian allegory to modern logos and mascots, pelicans have been interpreted as emblems of protection, sacrifice, care, and transformation. Their distinctive appearance and behaviors have inspired myths, religious symbolism, heraldic devices, institutional emblems, and even the naming of other animal species. This section explores the rich and varied ways in which pelicans have been woven into spiritual, national, artistic, and popular narratives around the world.

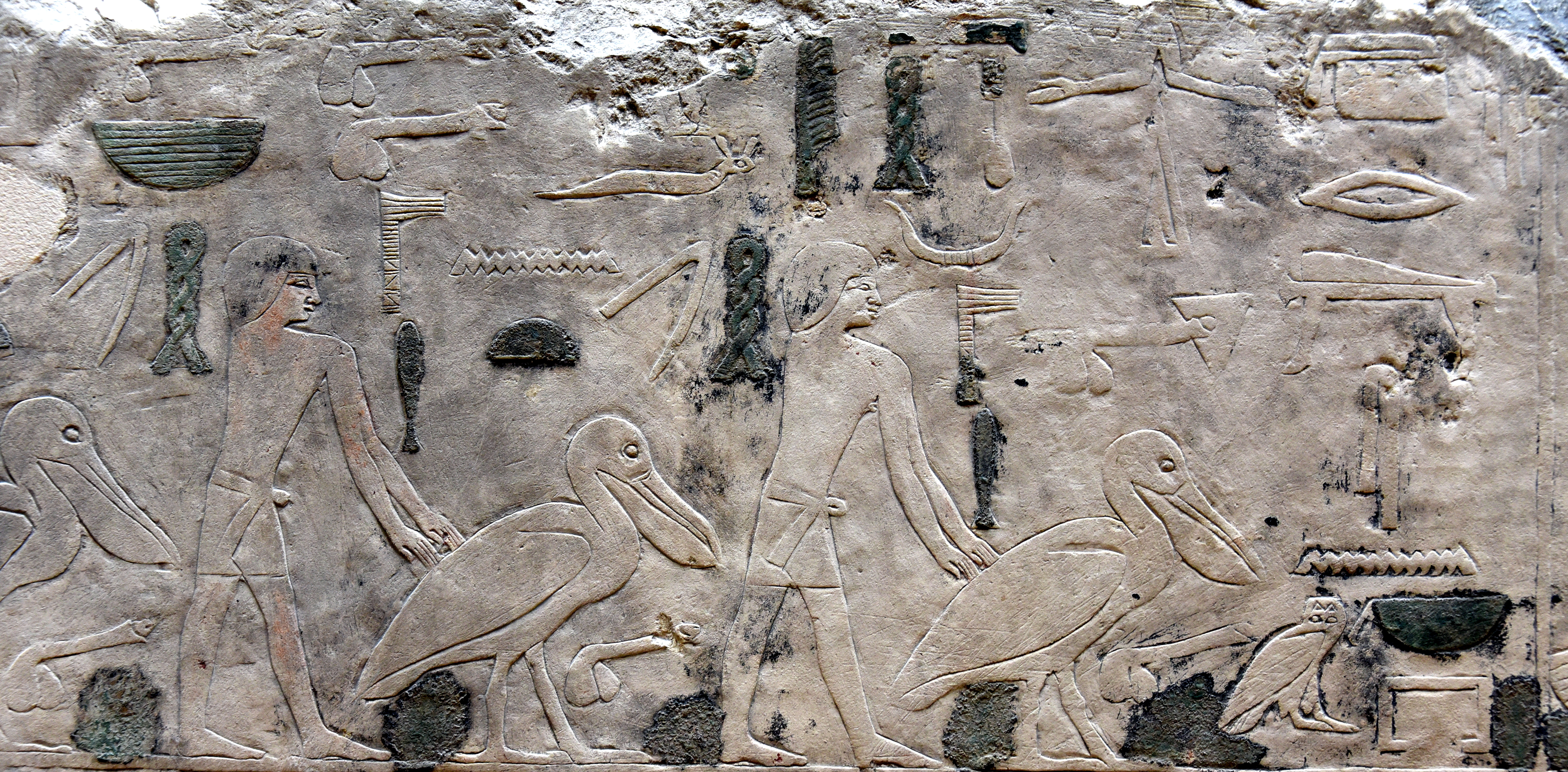
Breeding pelicans. Wall fragment from the Sun Temple of Nyuserre Ini at Abu Gurob, Egypt. c. 2430 BCE. Neues Museum, Berlin

=== Ancient and indigenous beliefs ===
The pelican (henet in Egyptian) was associated in Ancient Egypt with death and the afterlife. It was depicted in art on the walls of tombs, and figured in funerary texts, as a protective symbol against snakes. Henet was also referred to in the Pyramid Texts as the "mother of the king" and thus seen as a goddess. References in nonroyal funerary papyri show that the pelican was believed to possess the ability to prophesy safe passage in the underworld for someone who had died.

In Jewish dietary law, pelican is not considered kosher (fit for consumption), as it is a type of seabird and therefore considered an unclean animal.

An origin myth from the Murri people of Queensland, cited by Andrew Lang, describes how the Australian pelican acquired its black and white plumage. The story tells that the pelican was once a black bird. During a flood, he made a canoe to save drowning people. He fell in love with a woman and decided to save her, but she and her friends tricked him and escaped. The pelican consequently began preparing to go to war against them by daubing himself with white clay as war paint. Before he had finished, another pelican, on seeing such a strange piebald creature, killed him with its beak, and all such pelicans have been black and white ever since.

The Moche people of ancient Peru worshipped nature. They placed emphasis on animals and often depicted pelicans in their art.

=== Christian symbolism ===
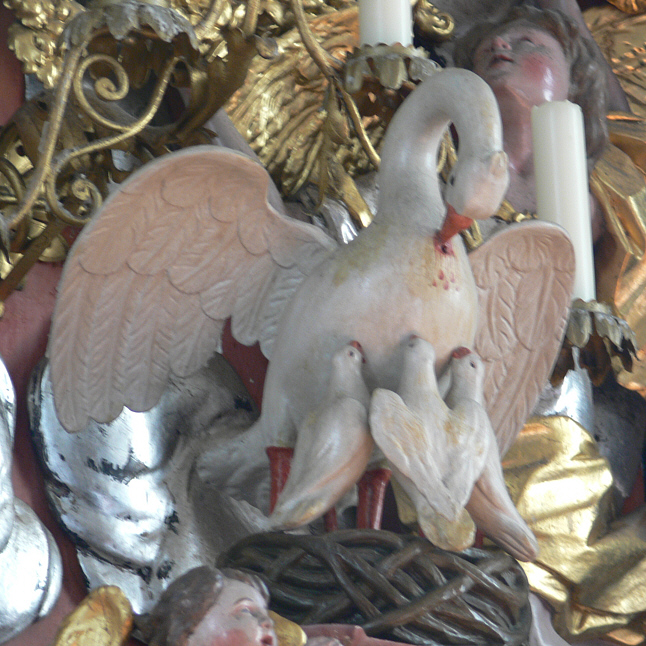
Statue of pelican wounding its breast to feed its chicks

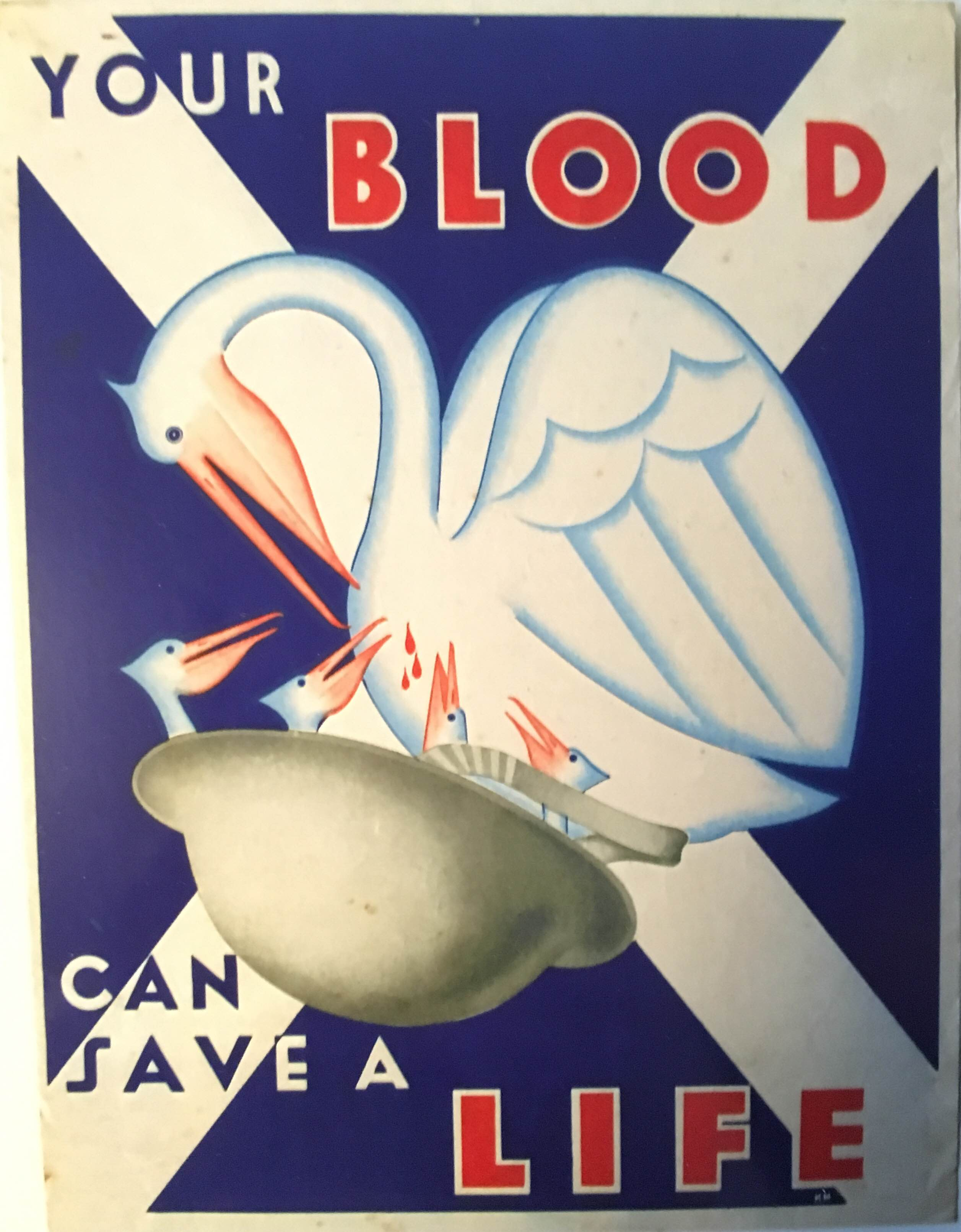
WWII 1944 Scottish blood donation poster

==== Myth of self-sacrifice ====
The Physiologus, a didactic Christian text from the 3rd or 4th century, claims that pelicans kill their young when they grow and strike their parents in the face, but then the mother laments them for three days, after which she strikes her side and brings them back to life with her blood. The Physiologus explains this as mirroring the pain inflicted on God by people's idolatry, and the self-sacrifice of Jesus on the cross which redeems the sinful (see the blood and water gushing from the wound in his side). This text was widely copied, translated, and sometimes closely paraphrased during the Middle Ages, for instance by 13th-century authors Guillaume le Clerc and Bartholomaeus Anglicus.

The self-sacrificial characterization of the pelican was reinforced by widely read medieval bestiaries. The device of "a pelican in her piety" or "a pelican vulning (from Latin vulnerō, "I wound, I injure, I hurt") herself" was used in religious iconography and heraldry.

The legends of self-wounding and the provision of blood occur across cultures. For example, an Indian folktale depicts a pelican that killed her young by rough treatment, but was then so contrite that she resurrected them with her own blood. Such legends may have arisen because of the impression a pelican sometimes gives that it is stabbing itself with its bill. In reality, it often presses this onto its chest to fully empty the pouch. Another possible derivation is the tendency of the bird to rest with its bill on its breast; the Dalmatian pelican has a blood-red pouch in the early breeding season and this may have contributed to the myth.

==== Religious art and literature ====
In a newer, also medieval version of the European myth, the pelican was thought to be particularly attentive to her young, to the point of providing them with blood by wounding her own breast when no other food was available. As a result, the pelican came to symbolise the Passion of Jesus and the Eucharist, supplementing the image of the lamb and the flag. This mythical characteristic is referenced in the hymn "Adoro te devote" ("Humbly We Adore Thee"), where in the penultimate verse, Saint Thomas Aquinas describes Christ as the loving divine pelican, one drop of whose blood can save the world. Similarly, the 1678 Christian allegorical novel The Pilgrim's Progress describes how "the pelican pierce[s] her own breast with her bill … to nourish her young ones with her blood, and thereby to show that Christ the blessed so loveth his young, his people, as to save them from death by his blood."

The pelican is featured in many Christian artworks, especially in Europe. For example, the first (1611) edition of the King James Bible contains a depiction of a pelican feeding her young in an oval panel at the bottom of the title page. The "pelican in her piety" appears in the 1686 reredos by Grinling Gibbons in the church of St Mary Abchurch in the City of London. Earlier medieval examples of the motif appear in painted murals, for example, the mural in the parish church of Belchamp Walter, Essex (c. 1350).

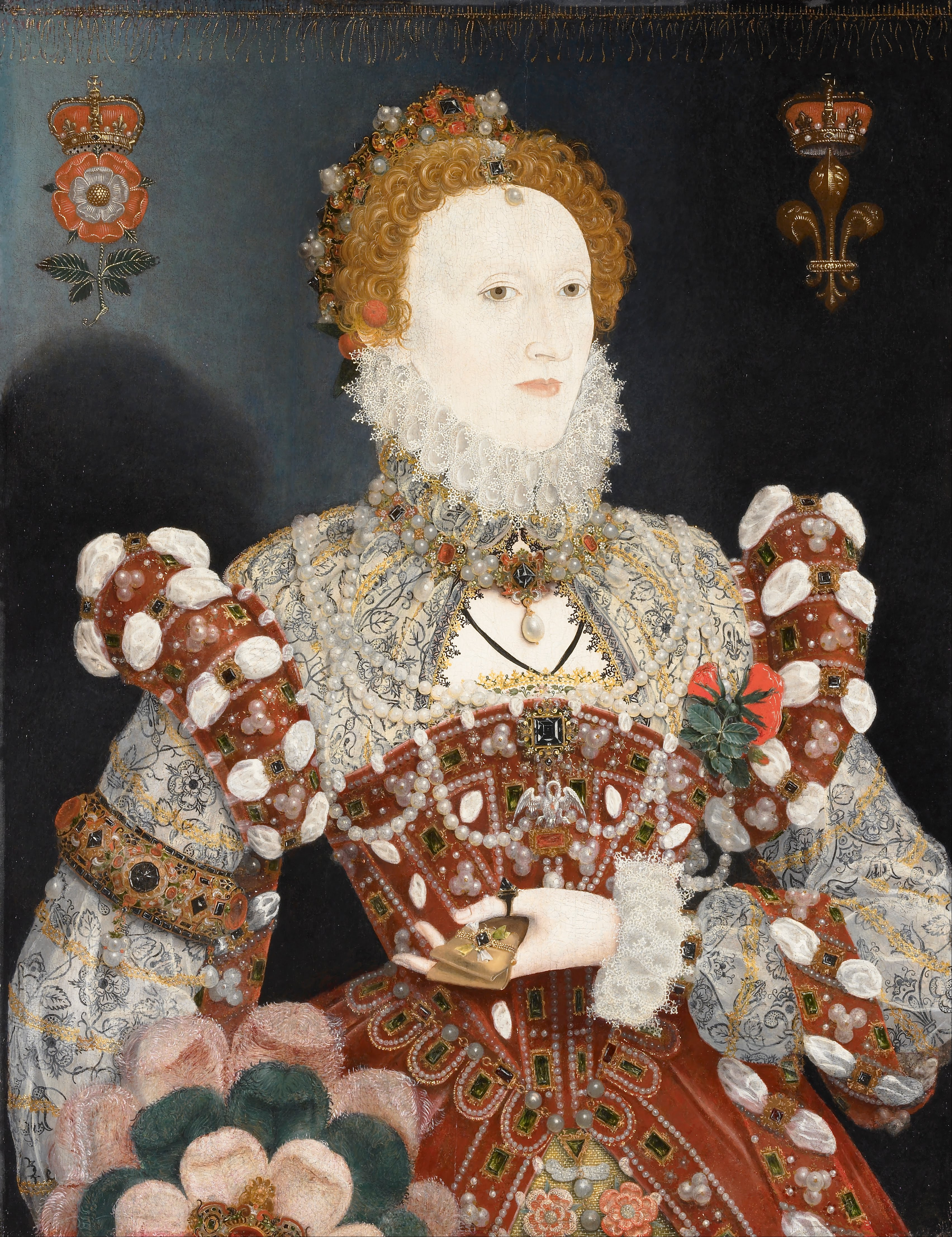
Queen Elizabeth I: the Pelican Portrait, by Nicholas Hilliard (circa 1573), in which Elizabeth I wears the medieval symbol of the pelican on her chest

==== Elizabeth I and the Church ====
Elizabeth I of England adopted the symbol, portraying herself as the "mother of the Church of England". A portrait of her called the Pelican Portrait was painted around 1573, probably by Nicholas Hilliard.

=== Heraldry and symbolism ===
The arms of the Kiszely family of Benedekfalva depict a "pelican in her piety" both in the crest and shield.

==== Heraldic imagery ====
Pelicans have featured extensively in heraldry, generally using the Christian symbolism of the pelican as a caring and self-sacrificing parent. Heraldic images featuring a "pelican vulning" refers to a pelican injuring herself, while a "pelican in her piety" refers to a female pelican feeding her young with her own blood. The King of Portugal John II adopted the pelican as is own personal sygil while he was Infante, evoking the Christian symbology to equate the sacrifice of his blood to feed the nation. The pelican as a symbol also became synonymous with the increasing charity efforts of the Santas Casas da Misericórdia during his reign and the reconstruction of the Hospital das Caldas da Rainha and the Hospital Real de Todos-os-Santos, which were mainly patronaged by his wife D. Leonor.

==== Public symbols ====
The heraldic pelican also ended up as a pub name and image, though sometimes with the image of the ship Golden Hind. Sir Francis Drake's famous ship was initially called Pelican, and adorned the British halfpenny coin.

=== Emblems and logos in institutions ===
==== Educational institutions ====
Pelicans are widely used as emblems by educational institutions, especially universities. In Louisiana, the bird adorns the seals of Louisiana State University, Tulane University, Louisiana Tech University, the University of Louisiana at Lafayette, Loyola University New Orleans, Southeastern Louisiana University, and Southern University. The seal of the Packer Collegiate Institute, depicting a pelican feeding her young, has been in use since 1885. The medical faculties of Charles University in Prague also have a pelican as their emblem, invoking the bird's long-standing association with self-sacrifice in Christian symbolism.

The image became also linked to the medieval religious feast of Corpus Christi. The universities of Oxford and Cambridge each have colleges named for the religious festival nearest the dates of their establishment, and both Corpus Christi College, Cambridge, and Corpus Christi College, Oxford, feature pelicans on their coats of arms.

==== Sports teams ====
In sports, the pelican serves as a mascot and logo for various teams and university athletics. It is the mascot of the New Orleans Pelicans NBA team, the Lahti Pelicans ice hockey team, Tulane University, and the University of the West Indies.

==== Commercial and nonprofit organizations ====
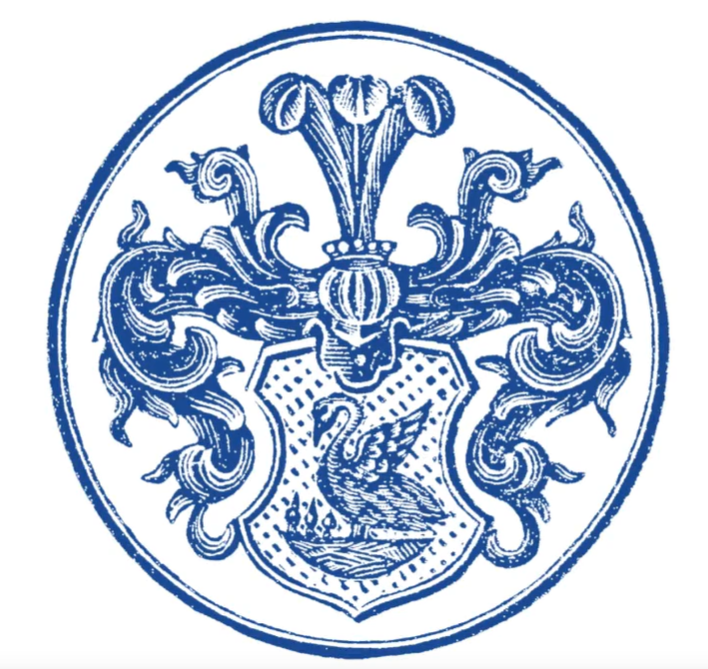
First logo of the German stationery company, Pelikan. Inspired by the coat of arms of its former owner Günther Wagner.

The pelican has also been used as a corporate emblem. The logo of the renowned German stationery company Pelikan was inspired by the family coat of arms of Günther Wagner, the company's former owner. He based the trademark on the heraldic image from his coat of arms, originally depicting a pelican feeding three chicks in a nest—later changed to four after the birth of his fourth child. While Wagner modified the original shield shape, the nurturing pelican motif remained central to the brand's visual identity.

Commercially, the pelican has been adopted as a corporate symbol in banking, publishing, and healthcare. A white pelican logo is used by the Portuguese bank Montepio Geral, The name and image were also employed by Pelican Books, an imprint of nonfiction titles published by Penguin Books. In the context of blood donation, where the pelican's symbolism of self-giving is especially resonant, the Irish Blood Transfusion Service features a pelican in its logo and operated for many years from Pelican House in Dublin. Similarly, Sanquin, the nonprofit organization responsible for blood supply in the Netherlands, uses a stylized pelican in its logo, continuing this humanitarian association.

Flag of the US state of Louisiana

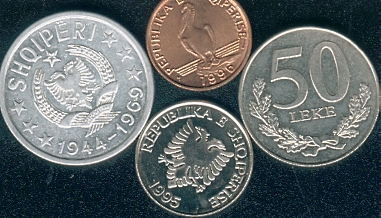
Pelican on the Albanian 1 lek coin.

=== National and regional symbols ===
As a cultural symbol of nations and states, the pelican holds prominent status. The great white pelican is the national bird of Romania. The brown pelican is the national bird of three Caribbean countries—Saint Kitts and Nevis, Barbados, and Sint Maarten—and features on their coats of arms. A Dalmatian pelican is also depicted on the reverse of the Albanian 1 lek coin, issued in 1996. In the United States, it is the state bird of Louisiana, which is colloquially known as the Pelican State; the bird appears on both the state flag and state seal.

Alcatraz Island was given its name by the Spanish because of the large numbers of brown pelicans nesting there. The word alcatraz is itself derived from the Arabic al-caduos, a term used for a water-carrying vessel and likened to the pouch of the pelican. The English name albatross is also derived by corruption of the Spanish word.

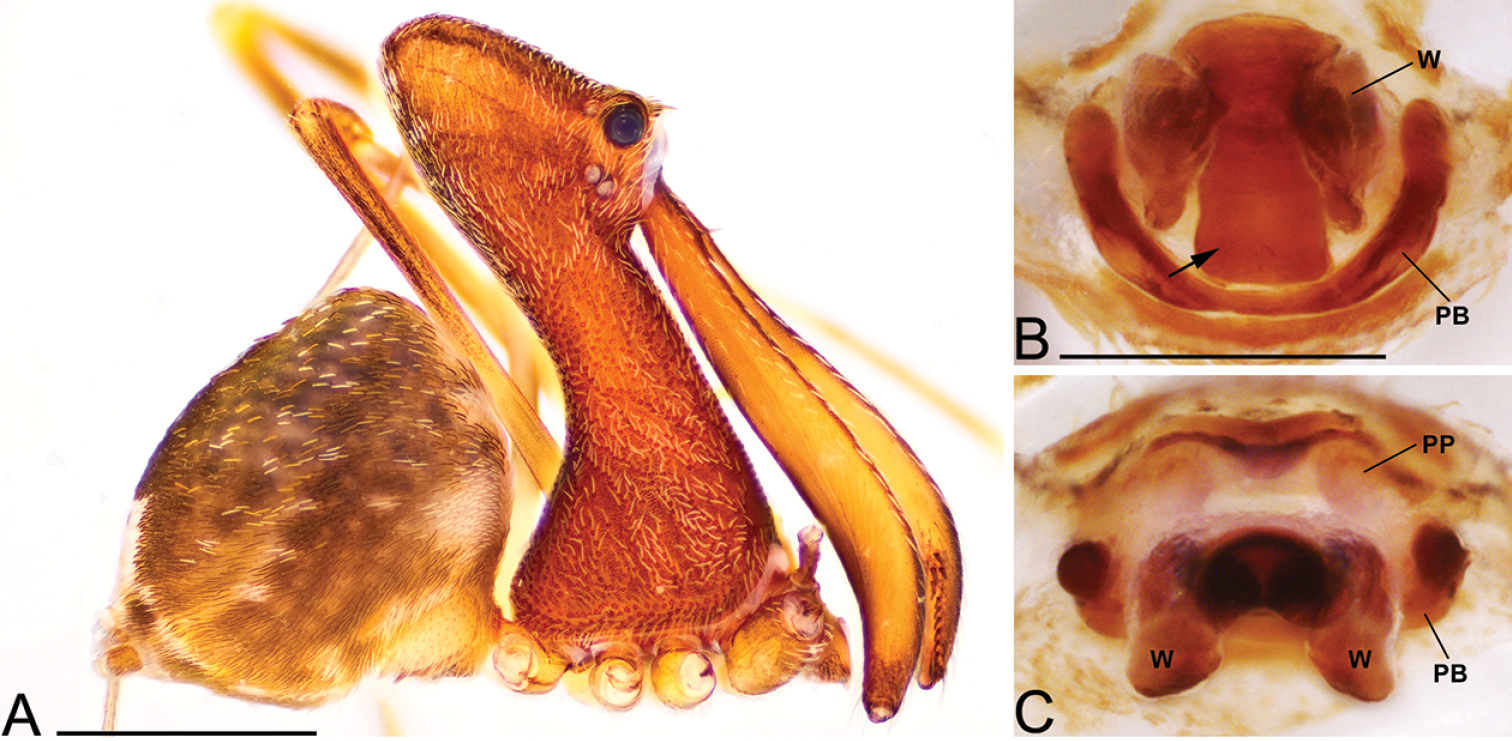
Eriauchenus milajaneae, a member of Archaeidae, also known as pelican spiders. A lateral view of a female and its genitalia.

=== Namesakes in nature ===
Archaeidae, a family of spiders, are known as 'pelican spiders'. The name refers to their unusually elongated jaws and necks used to catch their prey, which give them a profile similar to that of a pelican. They are found in Madagascar, South Africa, and Australia.

=== Literature and humor ===
The pelican is the subject of a popular limerick originally composed by Dixon Lanier Merritt in 1910 with several variations by other authors. The original version ran:

A wonderful bird is the pelican,
His bill will hold more than his belican,
He can take in his beak
Food enough for a week,
But I'm damned if I see how the helican.
