= Pelecanus schreiberi =

Pelecanus schreiberi Temporal range: Early Pliocene

Scientific classification
- Kingdom: Animalia
- Phylum: Chordata
- Class: Aves
- Order: Pelecaniformes
- Family: Pelecanidae
- Genus: Pelecanus
- Species: P. schreiberi

Binomial name
- Pelecanus schreiberi Olson, 1999

Extinct species of bird

Pelecanus schreiberi is a fossil pelican described by Storrs Olson from Early Pliocene (5.3 to 3.6 million year old) deposits in the Yorktown Formation of North Carolina. It was a large species with distinctive features suggesting that it represents an extinct lineage with no living descendants. The specific epithet commemorates Ralph W. Schreiber (1942–1988), a former curator of birds at the Natural History Museum of Los Angeles County and an authority on pelicans.

Collected in 1972 by one Gerard R. Case from a mine on the southern side of the Pamlico River near Aurora, North Carolina, the holotype is a right lower third of a femur of an egg-laying female. The denseness of the medullary bone indicated this last fact as it is a feature of living egg-laying female pelicans. The features of the femur allowed it to be classified as a pelican, but quite different from living species. Some foot bones (phalanges) have also been found. An incomplete quadrate bone and axis vertebra without a spine from a mine of the same age in Polk County in central Florida are tentatively considered to be the same species. These remains are from the Bone Valley Formation, of nearly the same age as the Yorktown Formation.

The female is around the same size as the largest individual great white pelicans (Pelecanus onocrotalus) or Dalmatian pelicans (P. crispus), so a male could have been even larger – possibly the largest living or fossil pelican recorded, rivalled only by subfossil remains of a New Zealand pelican that has been described as a subspecies of the Australian pelican (P. conspicillatus) and a mysterious late Miocene species Pelecanus odessanus from Ukraine.
