= Pelecanus odessanus =

Pelecanus odessanus Temporal range: Late Miocene

Scientific classification
- Kingdom: Animalia
- Phylum: Chordata
- Class: Aves
- Order: Pelecaniformes
- Family: Pelecanidae
- Genus: Pelecanus
- Species: P. odessanus

Binomial name
- Pelecanus odessanus Widhalm, 1886

Extinct species of bird

Pelecanus odessanus is a large species of fossil pelican, described in 1886 from Late Miocene fossil material since lost, from Novaja Slobodka, near Odesa in Ukraine. With a tarsometatarsus length of 150 mm (5.9 in), it was about the same size as Pelecanus schreiberi from the Early Pliocene of North America.
