= Pelecanus tirarensis =

Pelecanus tirarensis Temporal range: Late Oligocene–Middle Miocene

Scientific classification
- Kingdom: Animalia
- Phylum: Chordata
- Class: Aves
- Order: Pelecaniformes
- Family: Pelecanidae
- Genus: Pelecanus
- Species: P. tirarensis

Binomial name
- Pelecanus tirarensis Miller, 1966

Extinct species of bird

Pelecanus tirarensis is an extinct species of pelican from Late Oligocene to Middle Miocene deposits in north-eastern South Australia. It was described in 1966 by Alden H. Miller from fossil material discovered in the Lake Eyre Basin.

== History and naming ==
Pelecanus tirarensis was first described by Alden H. Miller in 1966 alongside a variety of pelican fossils from Australia. It was named from the distal end of the right tarsometatarsus, which was collected from Turtle Quarry of the Etadunna Formation, in the Lake Eyre Basin of north-eastern South Australia. The quarry has also produced fossils of fish, turtles and birds. In 1981, Patricia Vickers-Rich and Gerard Frederick van Tets referred four additional tarsometatarsi from the Etadunna, Namba and Wipajiri formations to the species.

== Description ==
P. tirarensis differs from any modern pelican through the medial surface of the second trochlea having a long depression on its back margin. The depression and ligamental pit are separated from each other by a ridge that runs horizontally along the trochlea. The front margin of the trochlea is more narrow than the back margin when viewed from the back. Unlike the modern brown pelican and American white pelican, the second trochlea extends further away from the main body of the tarsometatarsus than the fourth trochlea. Miller (1966) suggested that P. tirarensis further differed from modern pelicans by the size of the ligamental pit on the second trochlea. However, Rich and van Tets (1981) noted that the feature was too variable to be considered a diagnostic characteristic.

== Paleobiology ==
Remains of P. tirarensis are known from three geological formations in the Lake Eyre Basin; the older Etadunna and Namba formations and the younger Wipajiri Formation. Both the Etadunna and Namba formations date to the Late Oligocene and represent a fluvio-lacustrine (associated with rivers and lakes) environment. The Wipajiri Formation, however, is thought to be Middle Miocene in age, with its sediments deposited in a stream channel. The foot of P. tirarensis, which supported stronger ligaments, may indicate a greater strength in grasping and bracing.
