= Miopelecanus =

Miopelecanus Temporal range: Early Miocene

Scientific classification
- Kingdom: Animalia
- Phylum: Chordata
- Class: Aves
- Order: Pelecaniformes
- Family: Pelecanidae
- Genus: †Miopelecanus; Cheneval, 1984
- Species: †M. gracilis

Binomial name
- †Miopelecanus gracilis (A. Milne-Edwards, 1863)

Synonyms
- Pelecanus gracilis A. Milne-Edwards, 1863

Extinct genus of birds

Miopelecanus is a fossil genus of pelicans, with the species M. gracilis, dating from the Early Miocene.
