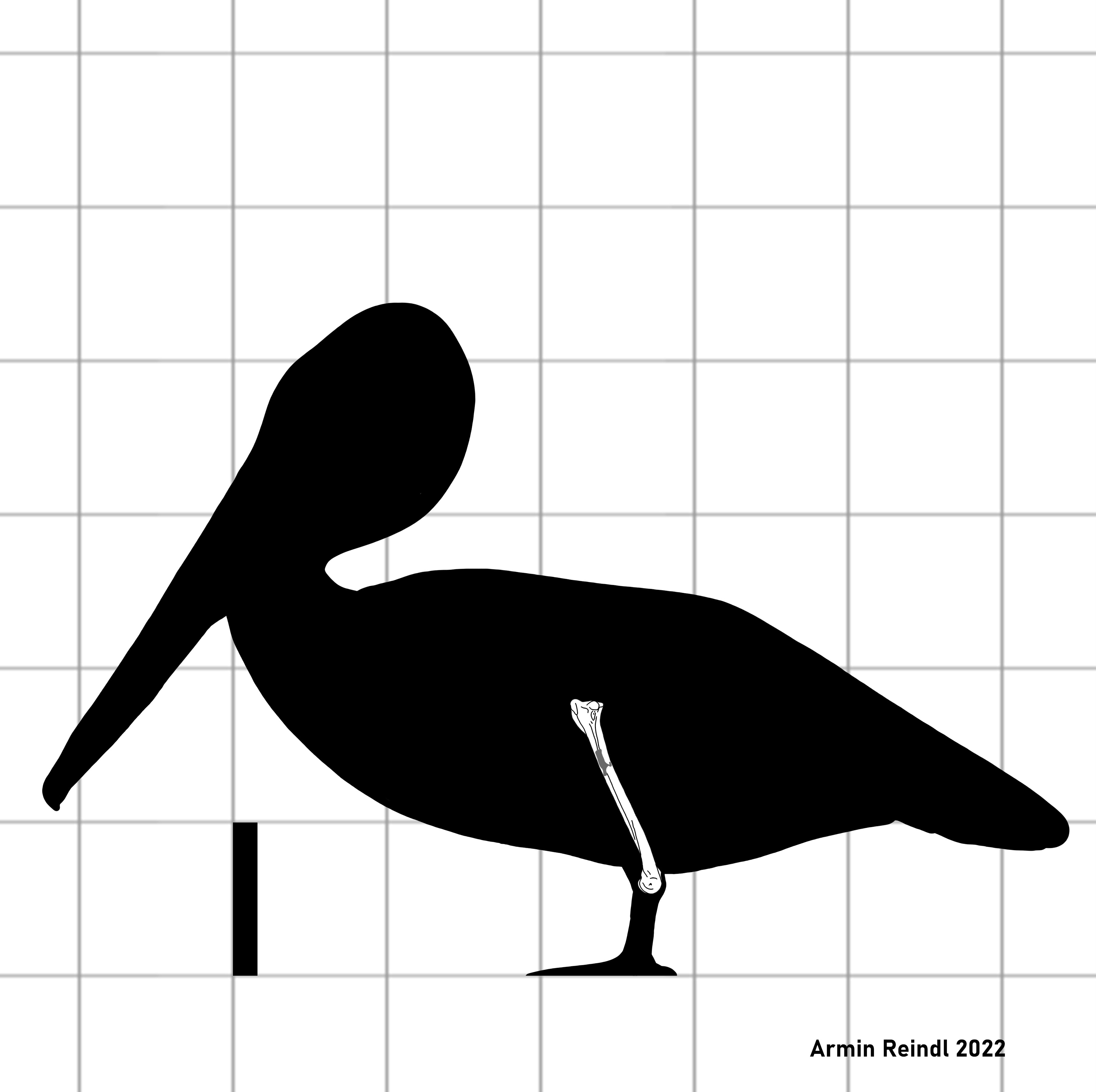

Scientific classification
- Kingdom: Animalia
- Phylum: Chordata
- Class: Aves
- Order: Pelecaniformes
- Family: Pelecanidae
- Genus: †Eopelecanus; El Adli et al., 2021
- Species: †E. aegyptiacus

Binomial name
- †Eopelecanus aegyptiacus El Adli et al., 2021

= Eopelecanus =

Eopelecanus Temporal range: Late Eocene, 36 Ma

Extinct genus of pelican bird

Eopelecanus is an extinct genus of pelican from the Birket Qarun Formation in the Wadi El Hitan in Egypt, dating to the late Eocene (Priabonian). The holotype, a right tibiotarsus discovered in 2008, represents the oldest record of pelicans to date, the only named fossil pelican to date and only one species is known, E. aegyptiacus.

== History and naming ==
The holotype specimen of Eopelecanus, a nearly complete tibiotarsus designated MUVP 505, was discovered in 2008 in the sandstone strata of the upper Birket Qarun Formation within the Egyptian "Valley of Whales". A cast of the fossil was created shortly afterwards and was permanently stored at the University of Michigan Museum of Paleontology. The fossil was eventually described and found to represent a distinct genus in 2021 by El Adli and colleagues.

The name Eopelecanus means "dawn pelecan", formed by the combination of the Ancient Greek "eos" (dawn) and "Pelecanus", the genus name of all extant pelicans. "Pelecanus" itself derives from the Ancient Greek "pelekys" for axe and the masculine suffix "-anus". The species name simply refers to the taxon's presence in Egypt.

== Description ==
Unlike in any modern pelican, the proximal portion of Eopelecanus' tibiotarsus shows no sinistral twisting of its body, which in extant species reveals the attachment site of the calf musculature when viewed from the front. The attachment site for the medial calf muscle is only weakly developed. The medial edge of the extensor groove, which houses the extensor muscle, and the medial condyle are roughly in line with one-another. The flexor fossa preserves a deep and expanded pneumatic opening. The dorsal end of the lateral cnemial crest is sinuous, which is not unique amongst pelicans but still sets Eopelecanus apart from the great white pelican, the brown pelican and most specimens of the American white pelican. The degree to which the bone is ossified, coupled with its surface texture, suggests that the individual the holotype belonged to was an adult.

The holotype bone measures 136 mm (5.4 in) long. Assuming that Eopelecanus shares similar proportions to its modern relatives, it was approximately the size of the brown pelican and slightly smaller than the pink-backed pelican and the spot-billed pelican, making it one of the smallest pelicans.

== Paleobiology ==
Although Eopelecanus can be clearly set apart from the modern pelican genus, its anatomy is still broadly similar to that of its modern relatives. This, along with pelican remains from the Oligocene, shows that this group is generally conservative with its morphology and has retained its bodyplan for a majority of the Cenozoic, changing only very little over the course of their evolution.

During the Priabonian, when Eopelecanus lived, northern Egypt was situated at the southern edge of the Tethys sea with large parts of its current landmass flooded. Wadi El Hitan, the Valley of Whales, was located just north-west of exposed land and preserves not just the remains of marine animals such as early whales and sirenians but also terrestrial mammals like the stem-elephants Moeritherium and Barytherium.
