= Garapadu =

- Village
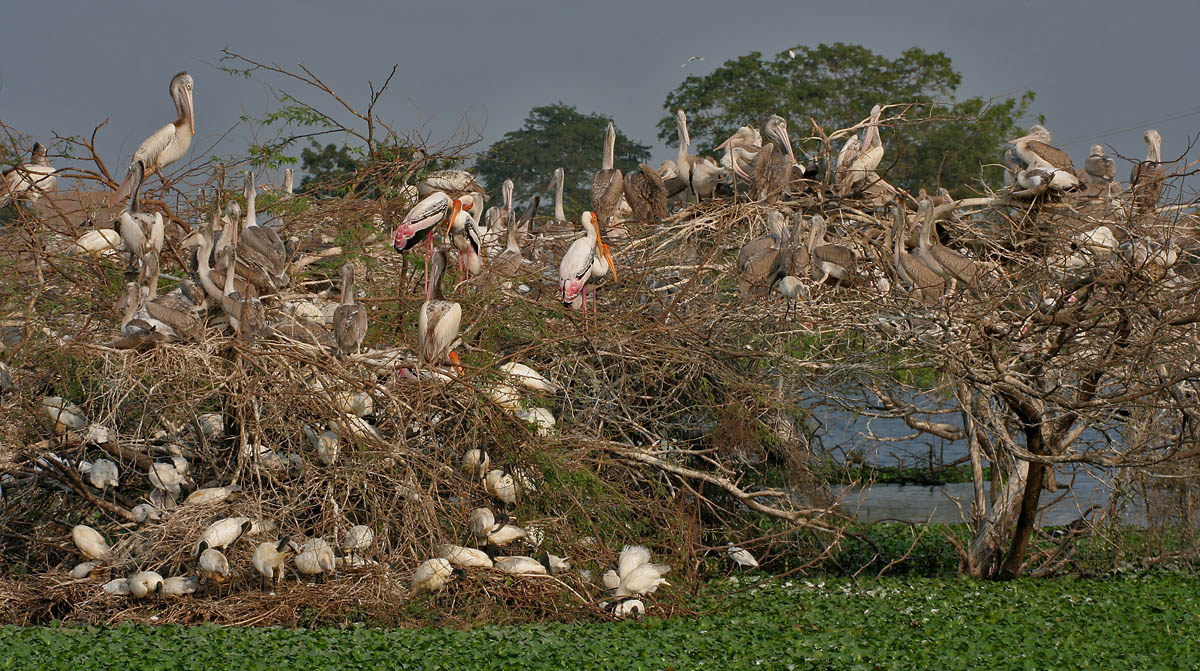
- Spot-billed Pelicans, Black-headed Ibises & Painted Storks nesting at Garapadu
- Interactive map of Garapadu
- Coordinates: 16.21°N 80.19°E
- Country: India
- State: Andhra Pradesh
- District: Guntur
- Talukas: Nadendla

Population (2011)
  - Total: 3,342

Languages
  - Official: Telugu
- Time zone: UTC+5:30 (IST)
- PIN: 522 xxx

Garapadu is a village in Vatticherukuru mandal, located in Guntur district of the Indian state of Andhra Pradesh.
