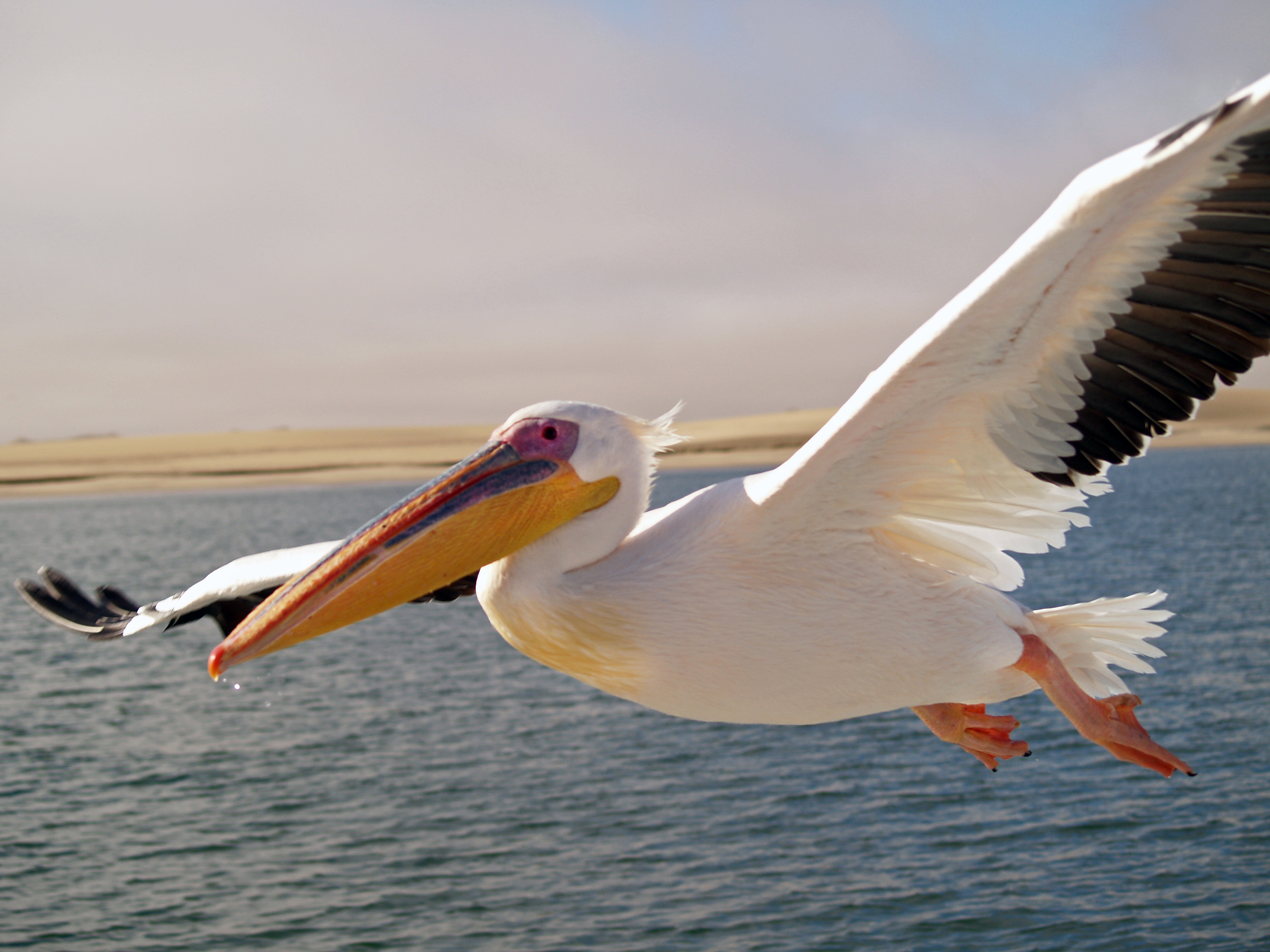
- A great white pelican in breeding condition flying over Walvis Bay, Namibia.

Scientific classification
- Kingdom: Animalia
- Phylum: Chordata
- Class: Aves
- Order: Pelecaniformes
- Suborder: Pelecani
- Family: Pelecanidae; Rafinesque, 1815

Type genus
- Pelecanus Linnaeus, 1758

Genera
- †Eopelecanus El Adli et al., 2021; †Miopelecanus Milne-Edwards, 1863; Pelecanus Linnaeus, 1758

= Pelecanidae =

Pelecanidae Temporal range: Late Eocene-Recent, 37.17–0 Ma Possible early origin based on molecular clock

Family of birds

The Pelecanidae is a family of pelecaniform birds within the Pelecani that contains three genera: the extinct Eopelecanus and Miopelecanus and the extant Pelecanus.

Pelecanids have existed since the late Eocene (Priabonian) and they still exist today.
