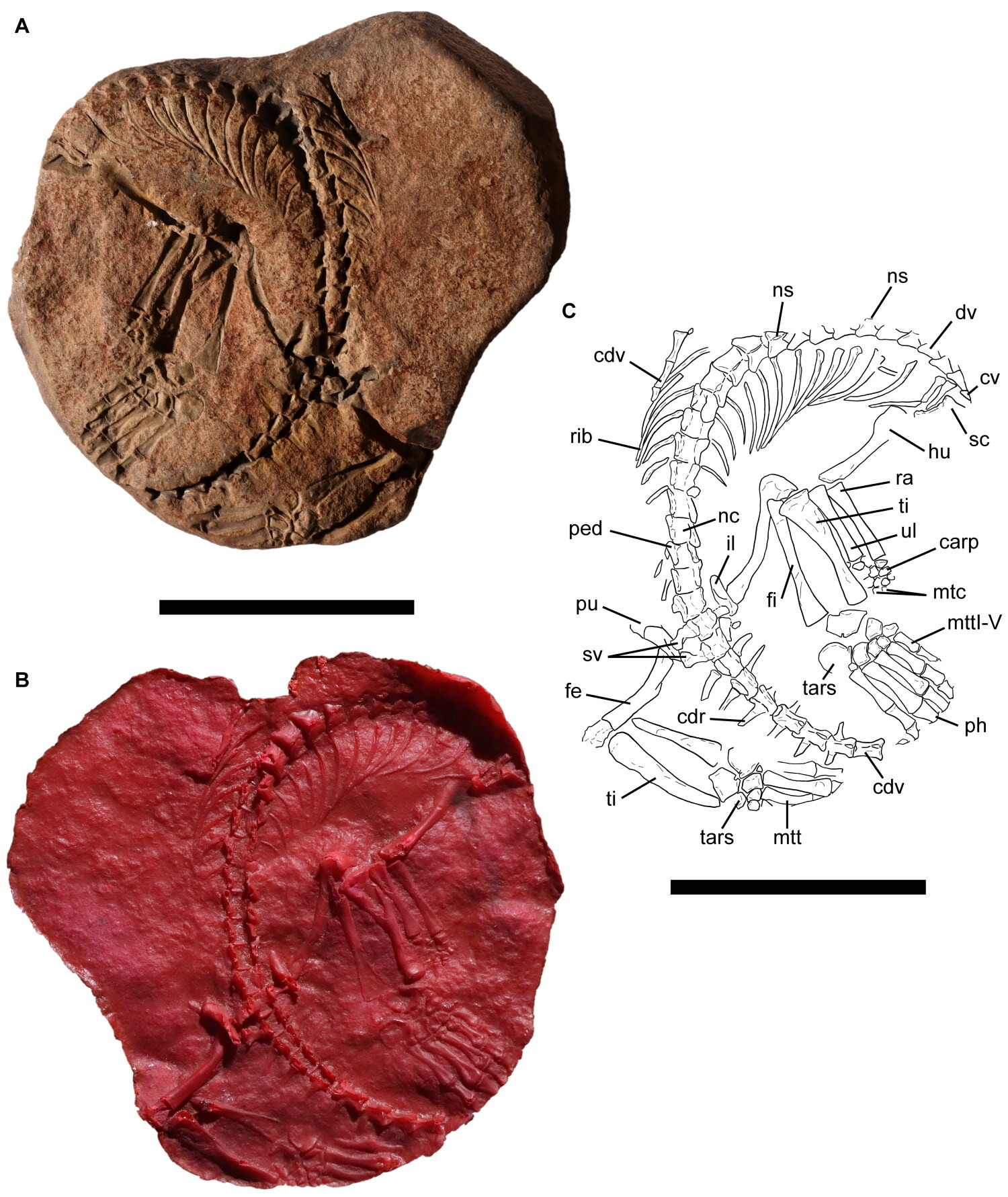
- Holotype specimen of G. capensis

Scientific classification
- Kingdom: Animalia
- Phylum: Chordata
- Class: Reptilia
- Clade: Neoreptilia
- Clade: Parapleurota
- Genus: †Galesphyrus; Broom, 1914
- Species: †G. capensis

Binomial name
- †Galesphyrus capensis Broom, 1914

= Galesphyrus =

Galesphyrus Temporal range: mid–late Permian, ~Capitanian–Changhsingian

Extinct genus of early reptiles

Galesphyrus is an extinct genus of early diapsid reptile known from the Permian of South Africa. The taxonomic, geographic, and geological histories of Galesphyrus are complex, and little research has been conducted on it. When described in 1914, it was identified as a therapsid, more closely related to mammals than reptiles. However, later researchers agreed that Galesphyrus is a reptile, possibly related to neodiapsids like Youngina. The genus contains a single species, Galesphyrus capensis, known from a single specimen, although a second specimen has historically been referred to it. Both specimens preserve the natural moulds of partial articulated skeletons.

== History ==
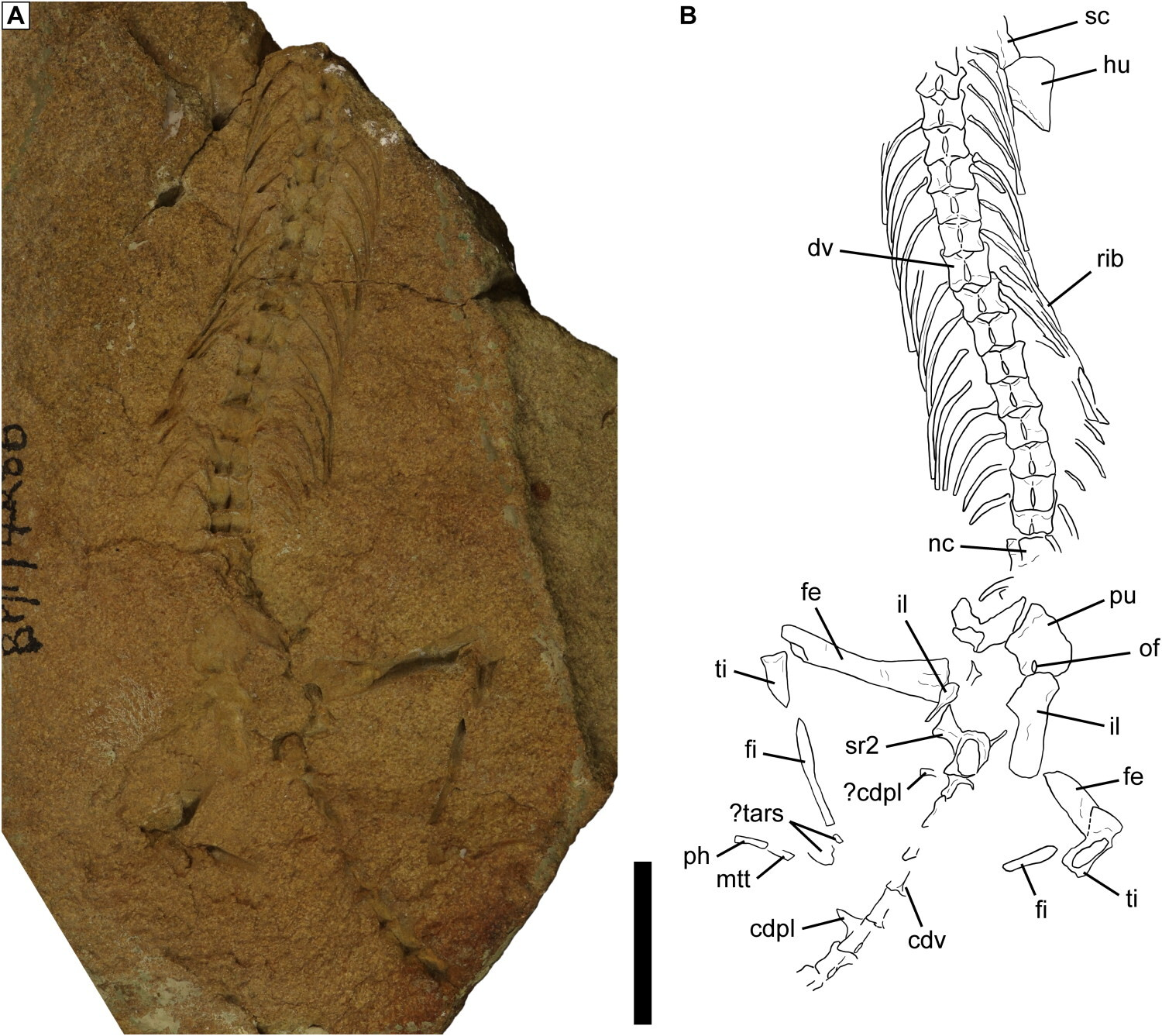
BP/1/4286, a specimen initially assigned to G. capensis

Robert Broom first described Galesphyrus capensis in 1914 based on SAM-PK-2758, a natural mould of a partial articulated skeleton. He identified it as a probable 'dromasaurian' member of the Therapsida—the broader clade containing mammals. About ten years later, he revised this classification after noticing reptilian features of the foot, preferring an 'eosuchian' identity. In 1976, Robert L. Carroll redescribed the taxon as a member of the Younginidae, also referring BP/1/4286, an additional mold of a partial skeleton with a fragmentary skull, to it. Discussing the relationships of early reptiles in 1985, Michael J. Benton identified characters supporting Galesphyrus in an indeterminate position within Neodiapsida but outside of the reptile crown group.

In 2025, Valentin Buffa and colleagues published a thorough redescription of Galesphyrus, determining it likely belongs to the clade Parapleurota, outside of Neodiapsida. They further noted anatomical differences between BP/1/4286 and the holotype, SAM-PK-2758, thus restricting Galesphyrus to the latter specimen.

The Galesphyrus holotype likely derives from Oorlogs Poort 85 Farm, a locality in Joe Gqabi District Municipality of Eastern Cape Province in South Africa, although the exact discovery location was not documented carefully and is now unknown. Outcrops near Oorlogs Poort 85 Farm belong to a range of biozones, spanning the Endothiodon, Cistecephalus, and Daptocephalus assemblage zones, with the Tapinocephalus Assemblage Zone being exposed nearby. As such, the temporal range of Galesphyrus can only be restricted to the late Capitanian through early Changhsingian ages of the middle to upper Permian period.

== Classification ==
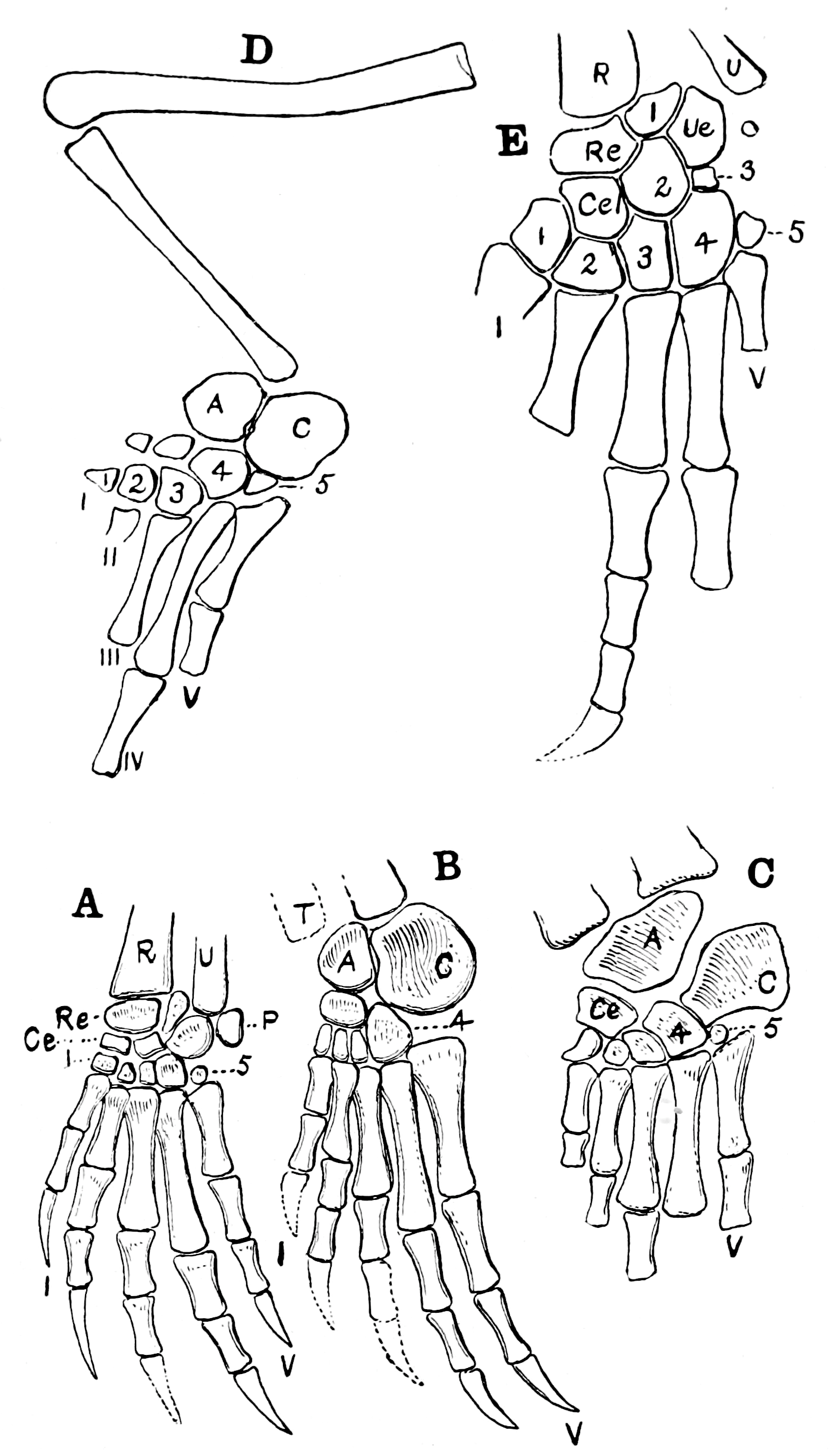
Illustrated hindlimb of Galesphyrus (C) compared to the fore- and hindlimbs of the therapsid Galechirus (A, B) and millerettid reptile Broomia (E, D)

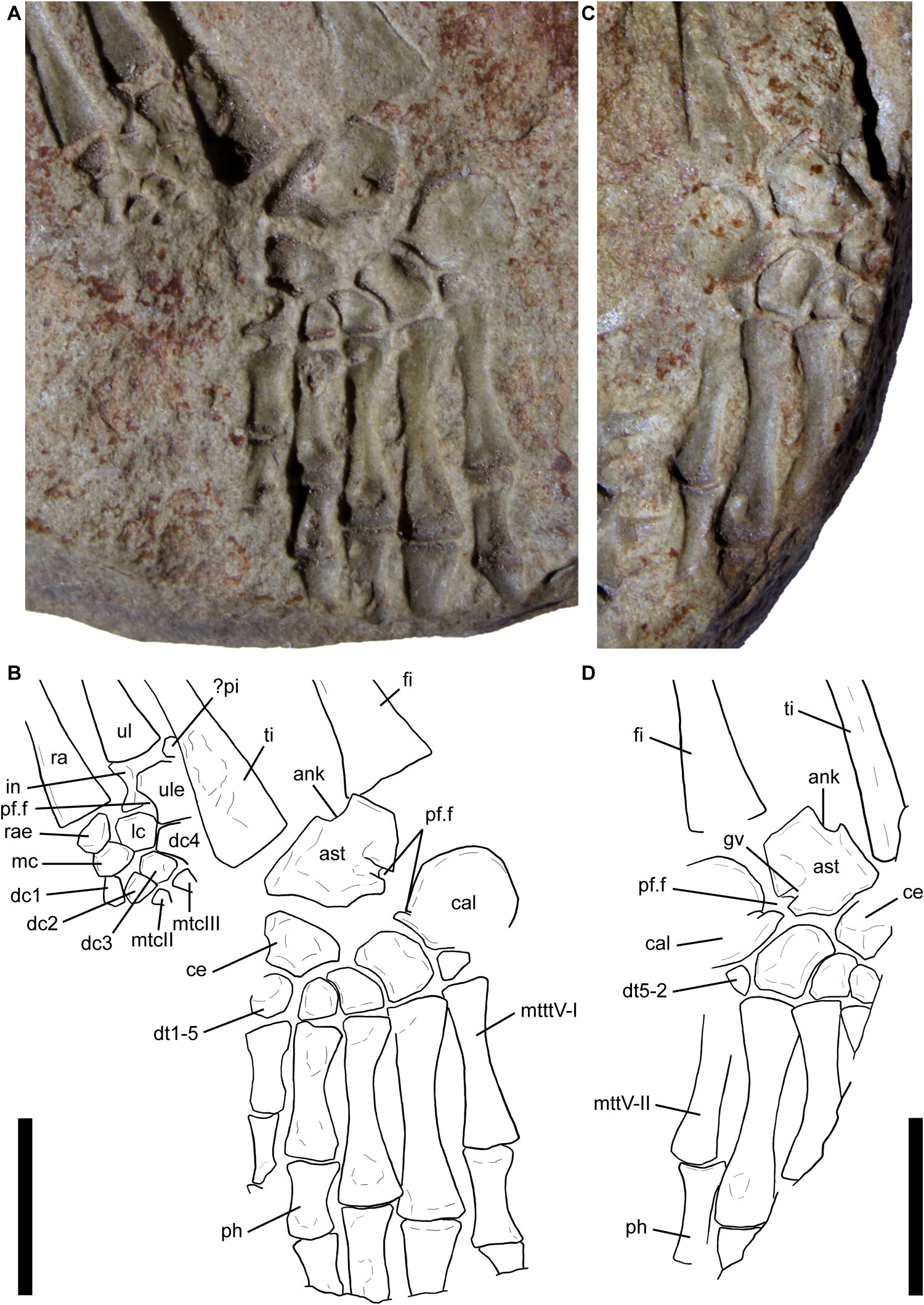
Photographs (top) and interpretive drawings (bottom) of the holotype pes of G. capensis

In their 2025 redescription of Galesphyrus (SAM-PK-2758) and the referred specimen BP/1/4286, Buffa, Jenkins, and Benoit performed a series of phylogenetic analyses to determine the relationships and affinities of these specimens. Using an updated and expanded version of the phylogenetic matrix published by Buffa and colleagues in their 2025 redescription of Thadeosaurus, the researchers performed a series of three unconstrained maximum parsimony analyses, removing fragmentary operational taxonomic units (OTUs) each time to improve resolution and better observe the position of Galesphyrus. In the third analysis, after trimming BP/1/4286 (only a fragmentary postcranium) and Lanthanolania (only a skull), Galesphyrus was recovered as a member of the researchers' "Clade P", generally equivalent to the Parapleurota of Jenkins and colleagues (2025), as the sister taxon to the clade formed by Millerettidae and Neodiapsida. These results are displayed in the cladogram below, which highlights taxa traditionally recovered within a monophyletic Parareptilia. The likely position of Lanthanolania is shown, inferred from the first analysis iteration. ⊞ buttons can be clicked to expand nodes.

- Diapsida
  - †Araeoscelidia
    ⊞
    - †Araeoscelis spp.
    - †Petrolacosaurus kansensis
    ⊟
  - - †Bolosauridae
      ⊞
      - †Bolosaurus major
      - †Eudibamus cursoris
      ⊟
    - - - †Australothyris smithi
        - †Acleistorhinidae
          ⊞
          - †Delorhynchus cifellii
          - †Feeserpeton oklahomensis
          ⊟
      - - †Varanopidae
          ⊞
          - †Orovenator mayorum
          - - †Archaeovenator hamiltonensis
            - - †Heleosaurus scholtzi
              - - †Mesenosaurus romeri
                - - †Mycterosaurus longiceps
                  - - †Aerosaurus wellesi
                    - †Varanops brevirostris
          ⊟
        - Neoreptilia
          - - †Mesosaurus tenuidens
            - †Procolophonia
              ⊞
              - †Pareiasauromorpha
                - †Deltavjatia rossicus
                - - †Emeroleter levis
                  - †Macroleter poezicus
              - †Procolophonoidea
                - †Procolophon trigoniceps
                - - †Barasaurus besairiei
                  - †Saurodektes kitchingorum
              ⊟
          - 'Clade P' (≈Parapleurota)
            - †Lanthanolania ivakhnenkoi
            - †Galesphyrus capensis
            - - †Millerettidae
                ⊞
                - †Broomia perplexa
                - - †Milleretta rubidgei
                  - †Milleropsis pricei
                ⊟
              - Neodiapsida
                - †Younginidae
                  ⊞
                  - †Youngina capensis
                  - - †Akkedops bremneri
                    - †Scyllacerta creanae
                  ⊟
                - - †Tangasauridae
                    ⊞
                    - †Kenyasaurus mariakaniensis
                    - - †Acerosodontosaurus piveteaui
                      - - †Thadeosaurus colcanapi
                        - - †Hovasaurus boulei
                          - †Tangasaurus mennelli
                    ⊟
                  - - - †Claudiosaurus germaini
                      - †Weigeltisauridae
                        ⊞
                        - †Coelurosauravus elivensis
                        - †Rautiania spp.
                        - †Weigeltisaurus jaekeli
                        ⊟
                    - Sauria
                      - Archosauromorpha
                      - Lepidosauromorpha

former 'parareptiles'
