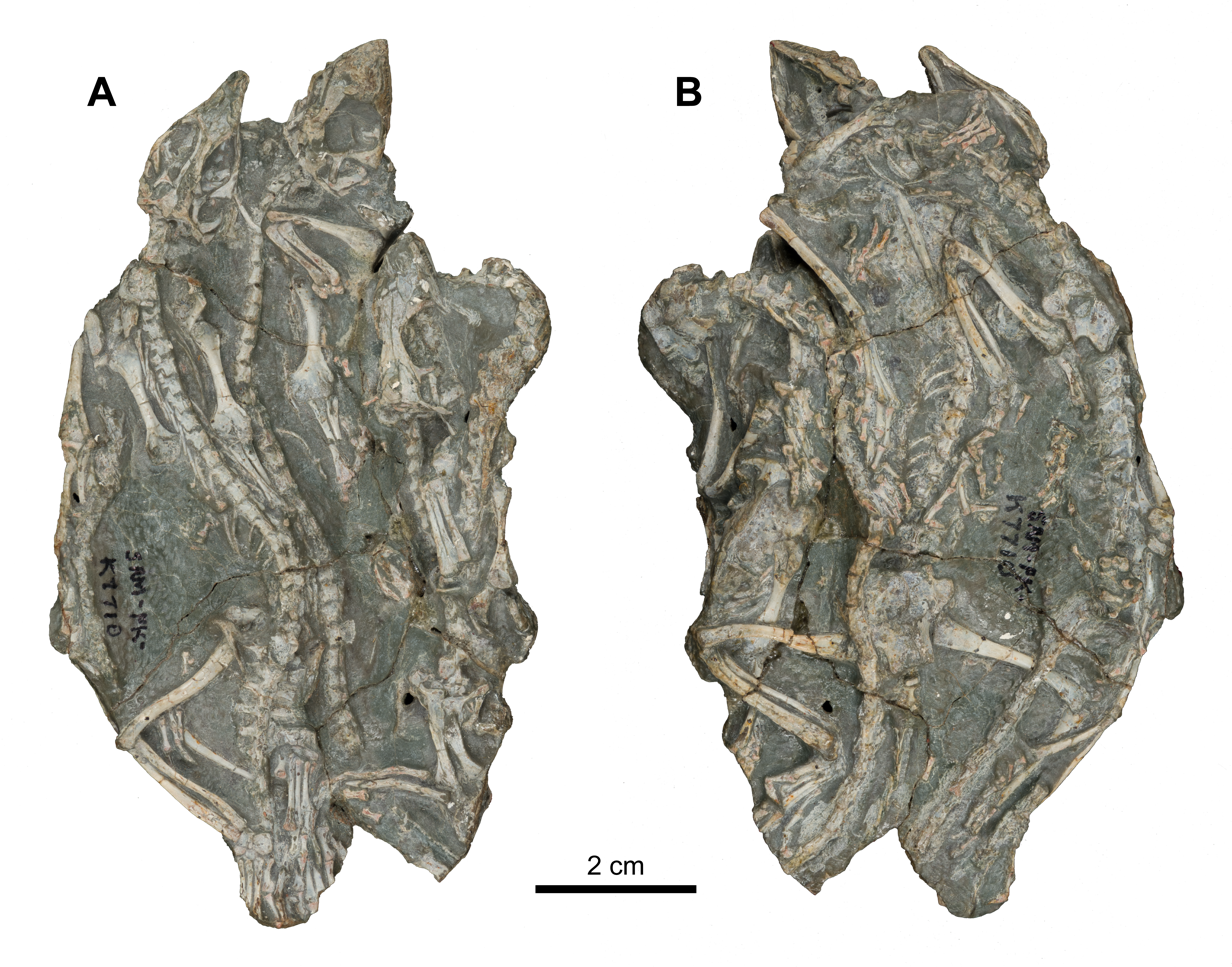
- S. creanae holotype aggregation in dorsal (left) and ventral (right) views

Scientific classification
- Kingdom: Animalia
- Phylum: Chordata
- Class: Reptilia
- Clade: Neodiapsida
- Family: †Younginidae
- Genus: †Scyllacerta; Jenkins et al., 2026
- Species: †S. creanae

Binomial name
- †Scyllacerta creanae Jenkins et al., 2026

= Scyllacerta =

Scyllacerta Temporal range: Late Permian (early–middle Wuchiapingian), ~258–256.8 Ma

Genus of extinct stem-reptile

Scyllacerta is an extinct genus of neodiapsid stem-reptile known from the late Permian (Wuchiapingian age) Teekloof Formation (Endothiodon Assemblage Zone) of South Africa. The genus contains a single species, Scyllacerta creanae, known from an aggregation of at least six articulated individuals, four of which have articulated skulls. This specimen was originally identified as preserving immature individuals of the closely related genus Youngina, but it is now classified as a distinct member of the family Younginidae, of which it is the oldest known member. Despite the small size of the known Scyllacerta individuals compared to Youngina, they likely represent nearly mature animals. Scyllacerta bears a tympanic fossa on the back of its skull, suggesting that the middle ear of living reptiles was present in their Permian ancestors.

== History ==
=== Discovery ===
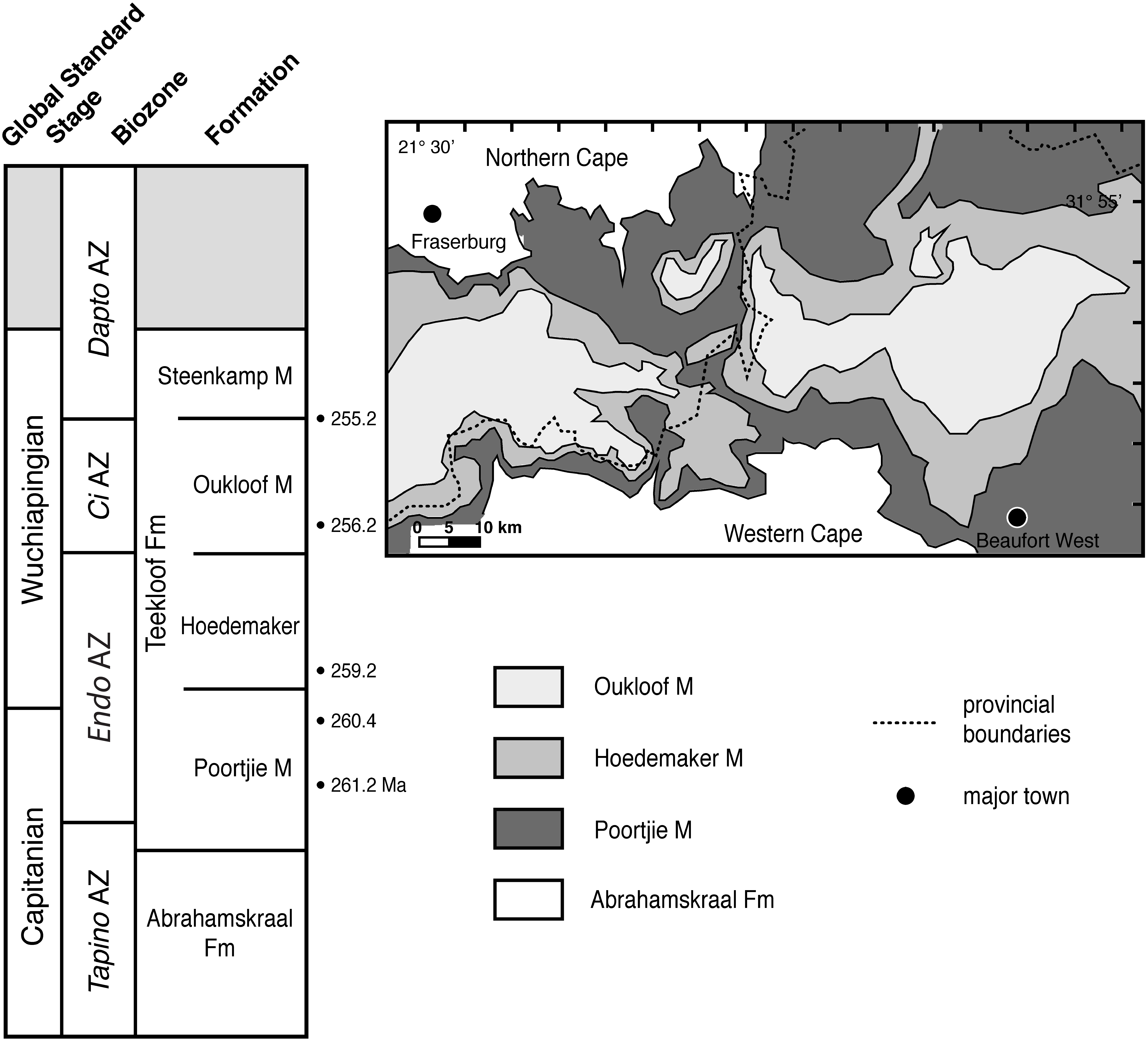
Geological context of the Teekloof Formation

In the late 1900s, Roger M. H. Smith conducted extensive fieldwork in the Hoedemaker Member of the Teekloof Formation of South Africa, with the purpose of cataloging and describing the taphonomy of vertebrate fossils in the region's floodplain deposits. Smith, with the assistance of Annelise Crean and Paul October, collected 329 separate fossil specimens in three outcrop localities: Wilgerboschkloof, Leeukloof, and Dunedin (named after the farms on which the excavations took place). These outcrops are part of the Endothiodon Assemblage Zone (EAZ). (Note: The nomenclatural history of Karoo Supergroup assemblage zones (AZ) is convoluted, and their classifications have been extensively modified. At the time of Smith's publication, the EAZ was referred to under a two-name system, as the Tropidostoma–Endothiodon AZ. This was later simplified to the Tropidostoma AZ, before being combined with the Pristerognathus AZ in 2020 to form the Endothiodon AZ. Within the EAZ, Scyllacerta is more precisely placed in the Tropidostoma–Gorgonops subzone.) Smith published the results of this work in 1993, concluding that the outcrops of the Hoedemaker Member could be classified using their sedimentological characteristics and the taphonomic aspects of preserved vertebrate fossils; "channel bank" and "distal floodplain" outcrops are generally comparable in the rarer preservation of vertebrate fossils and prevalence of isolated skulls and postcranial bones, while "proximal floodplain" deposits preserve, vertebrate fossils more commonly, with a wide range of taphonomic preservation modes and proportionately more specimens found in anatomical articulation (bones in lifelike positions).

=== Research history ===
One fossil in particular, an aggregation of several small, articulated reptiles embedded in micrite-cemented siltstone, was collected by Smith from Leeukloof 43. It was prepared by Annelise Crean using a dental drill and needle, and then permanently accessioned at the Iziko South African Museum (SAM) as specimen SAM-PK-K7710. In 1995, Smith and Susan E. Evans published an initial description of this specimen, identifying five individuals of similar size, preserved in lifelike positions. They recognized that these specimens are about half the size of those referred to Youngina, another early reptile from younger (more recent) rocks in South Africa. While they acknowledged the possibility that these newly discovered individuals could belong to a new taxon, they concluded that they likely belong to immature Youngina individuals. They further noted that these individuals were found in stratigraphically lower rock outcrops, making them around three million years older than Youngina. The following year, Smith and Evans published a more detailed description and analysis of SAM-PK-K7710. In addition to the five nearly-complete, articulated skeletons (labeled a–e), they identified a sixth individual (f), represented by an isolated hindlimb. Based on the observable anatomy, they remarked these individuals show "no marked morphological differences" from Youngina, based on previous descriptions of this taxon. Based on the closure of the neurocentral sutures, ossification of the tarsals and carpals, close proximity of elements of the pectoral and pelvic girdles, and fusion of the sacral and caudal ribs to their respective vertebrae (all indicators of at least partial maturity), the researchers concluded the individuals are not hatchlings, despite their small size. However, various features are also apparent indicators of skeletal immaturity, including the lack of sculpturing and complex sutures on the skull roof bones, proportionately large eyes and parietal foramen, and weakly ossified sternal plates.

Due to the perceived importance of Youngina as an "archetypal" diapsid reptile representing the ancestral anatomical condition for the reptile skull, the description of SAM-PK-K7710 was seen as a valuable contribution, as it preserves most of the postcranial skeleton, whereas Youngina had previously been known from almost entirely cranial remains. As such, many later researchers incorporated it as a specimen of Youngina in phylogenetic analyses including this taxon, in the context of the evolutionary relationships of early reptiles. In a 2021 description of the anatomy and relationships of the Permian Weigeltisaurus of Germany, Adam C. Pritchard and colleagues included SAM-PK-K7710 in their phylogenetic analysis, but as an entity distinct from Youngina, given significant differences they observed between skull and limb anatomy of the two.

In February 2025, Mooney, Scott, and Reisz described Akkedops bremneri as a new early reptile from South Africa. These authors established SAM-PK-K6205, an isolated skull and fragmentary postcrania, as the holotype (name-bearing) specimen, and referred BP/1/2614 (an isolated and crushed skull) and SAM-PK-K7710 to this species, incorrectly claiming they had all been collected at the same site. They further suggested that the cranial anatomy of all three specimens is indistinguishable, supporting their referral to a single taxon, distinct from Youngina. In their 2025 redescription of Galesphyrus, a more distantly related Permian South African sauropsid, Buffa and colleagues questioned the referral of SAM-PK-K7710 to Akkedops, and restricted their phylogenetic scoring of this taxon to just its holotype, SAM-PK-K6205.

=== Naming ===
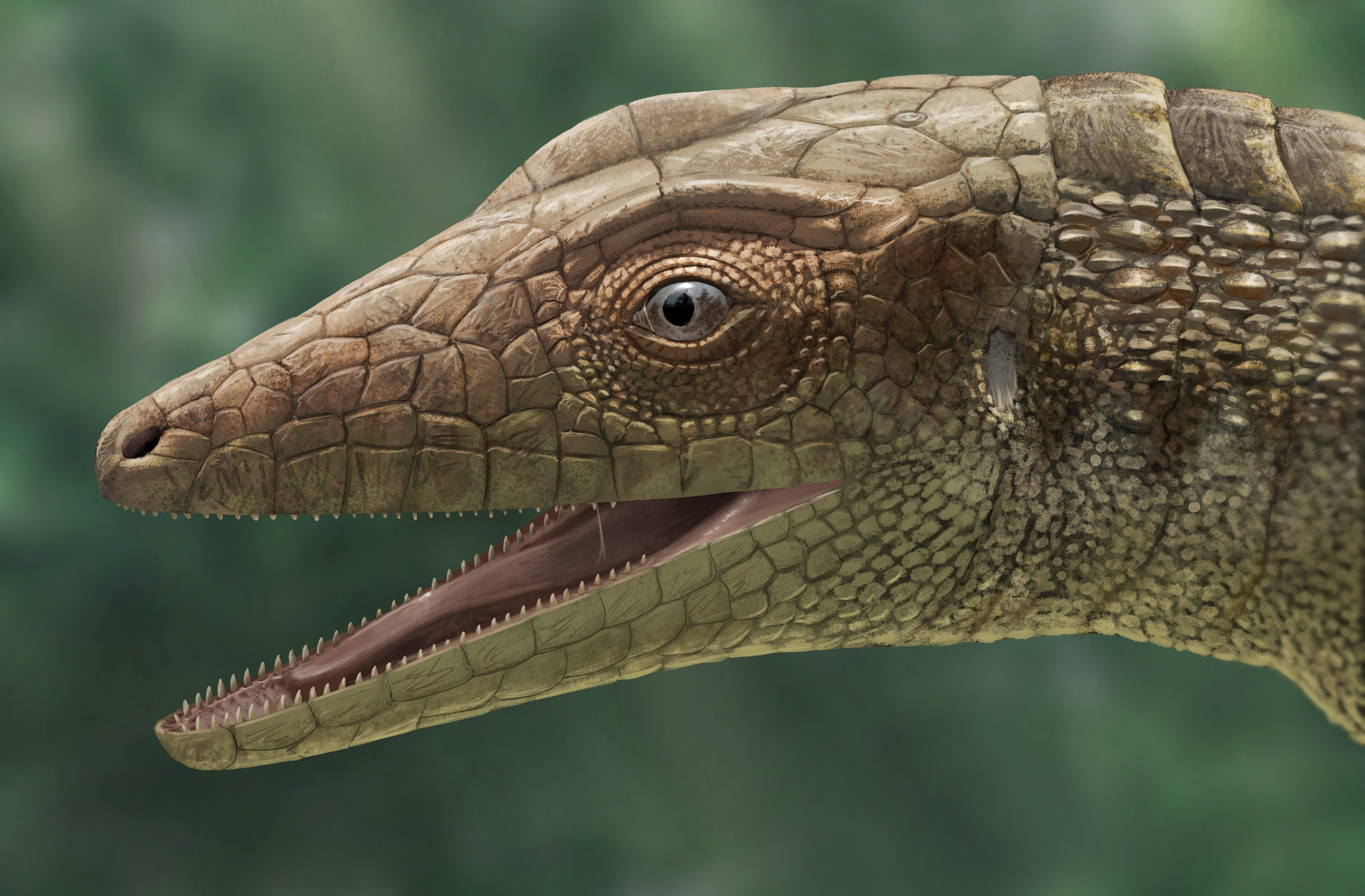
Life restoration of S.creanae

In 2026, Xavier A. Jenkins and colleagues published a redescription of SAM-PK-K7710 based on high-resolution synchrotron μCT scans of the specimen. They identified numerous anatomical characters distinguishing it from both Akkedops and Youngina. Furthermore, a review of discovery localities for the involved specimens showed that the Akkedops holotype (SAM-PK-K6205) was collected more than 180 kilometres (110 mi) away from Leeukloof 43, in a higher (more recent) assemblage zone, the Cistecephalus AZ, at Matjiesfontein 167. BP/1/2614 was also collected at a distinct locality in the even younger Daptocephalus AZ. As such, they described SAM-PK-K7710 as belonging to a new genus and species of younginid, Scyllacerta creanae. SAM-PK-K7710a, the most complete individual of those preserved in the aggregation, was selected as the holotype of the species.

The generic name, Scyllacerta, combined a reference to Scylla, a hybrid monster in Greek mythology described as inhabiting a cavern, bearing many heads, and having multiple rows of teeth, with lacerta, a Latin word meaning 'lizard'. This name was chosen as SAM-PK-K7710 represents an aggregation of multiple individuals (with multiple skulls) preserved in a 'cavern' (burrow), with each skull bearing many rows of palatal teeth. The specific name, creanae, honors Annelise Crean, the preparator of the specimen.

== Classification ==
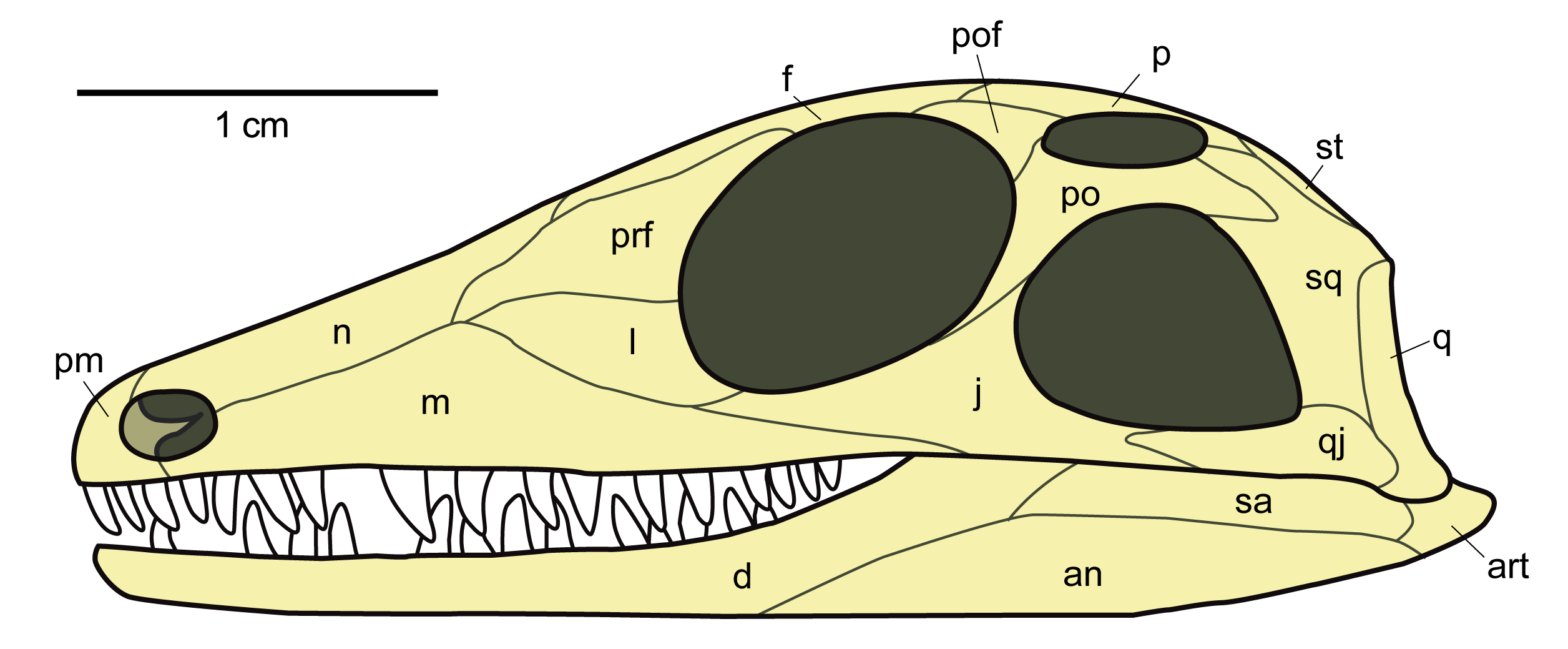
Reconstructed skull of Youngina capensis

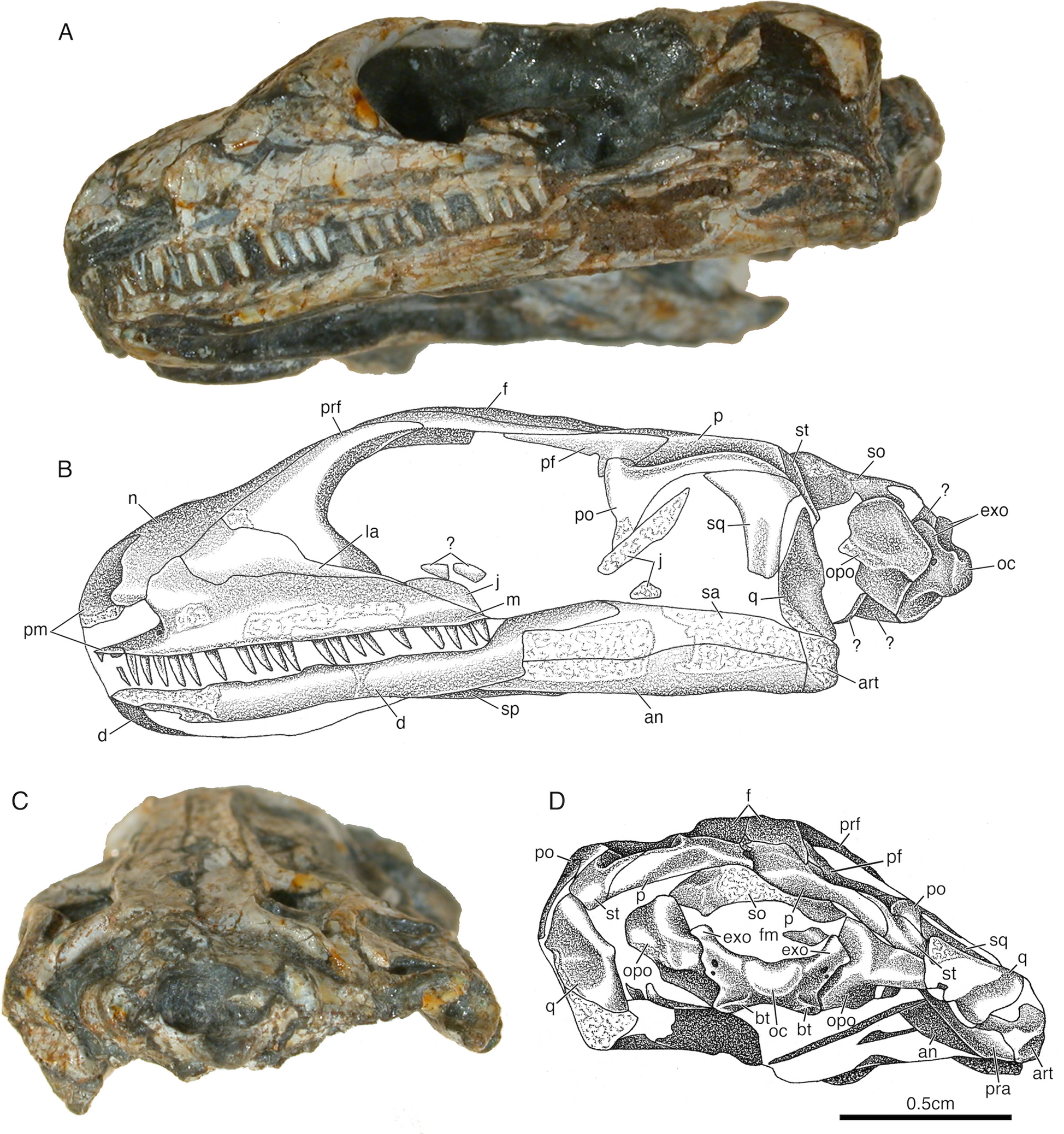
Holotype skull of Akkedops bremneri

Despite its long taxonomic history, SAM-PK-K7710 has always been regarded as part of the reptile stem-group, closely related to Youngina. In their phylogenetic analysis, Pritchard et al. (2021) recovered the aggregation specimen—then unnamed, referred to as the 'Tropidostoma Zone younginiform'—as the sister taxon to Youngina, with this clade forming an unresolved polytomy with a clade comprising traditional 'tangasaurids' and Sauria (Archosauromorpha + Lepidosauromorpha). In their 2025 description of Akkedops, Mooney et al. used an updated version of a phylogenetic matrix published by Buffa and colleagues in 2024. These results placed Akkedops (including characters scored for material only present in SAM-PK-K7710) in a position diverging immediately after Youngina, as the sister taxon to Sauria. However, an extensively updated version of this matrix was published by Buffa et al. (2025), in which SAM-PK-K7710 was treated as a separate operational taxonomic unit (OTU) from Akkedops. These results placed these two as sister taxa, in a broader Younginidae also including Youngina. Herein, Tangasauridae, Claudiosaurus, and Weigeltisauridae separated younginids from Sauria.

In 2025, Jenkins and colleagues published the results of an expansive phylogenetic dataset based on novel data obtained from synchrotron μCT data, especially from the braincase and palate, which are more difficult to study in physical fossil specimens. This analysis included SAM-PK-K7710—then unnamed, as the 'EAZ younginiform'—which was recovered as the sister taxon to Youngina, together forming the family Younginidae. A novel result recovered by this study was the placement of the Millerettidae closer to crown-group reptiles than previous work, which had placed the clade within 'Parareptilia', now regarded as a polyphyletic assemblage of taxa. Millerettids were placed diverging immediately before younginids in the newly recognized clade Parapleurota. Younginidae thus formed the earliest-diverging group within Neodiapsida. As in the results of Buffa et al. (2025), some other lineages were recovered between Younginidae and the reptile crown-group (Sauria).

To more accurately assess the relationships of Scyllacerta in their 2026 description of the taxon, Jenkins and colleagues published an updated version of this phylogenetic dataset comprising 15 additional OTUs and 107 additional anatomical characters. The tree topology was largely similar to that recovered previously, with Scyllacerta placed as the sister taxon to Akkedops + Youngina. They recovered conflicting results regarding the relationships of younginids to tangasaurids; an implied weighting parsimony analysis (Topology A below) placed them as successive lineages (rendering 'Younginiformes' paraphyletic), while a time-calibrated Bayesian analysis (Topology B below) recovered a monophyletic Younginiformes, with Tangasauridae as the sister group to Younginidae (including Saurosternon). Abbreviated versions of these analyses are displayed below. This uncertainty may be in part due to limited knowledge about the anatomy of some members of this clade, with the potential for future detailed studies to provide improved resolution.

Topology A: Implied weighting analysis

- Reptile total-group
  - †Araeoscelidia
  - - †Bolosauridae
    - - †Erpetonyx arsenaultorum
      - Neoreptilia
        - †Ankyramorpha
          ⊞
          - †Acleistorhinidae
          - - †Pareiasauromorpha
            - †Procolophonoidea
          ⊟
        - - †Mesosauridae
          - - - †Orovenator mayorum
              - - †Ascendonanus nestleri
                - †Cabarzia trostheidei
            - Parapleurota
              - †Millerettidae
                ⊞
                - †Lanthanolania ivakhnenkoi
                - - †Broomia perplexa
                  - - †Milleretta rubidgei
                    - †Milleropsis pricei
                ⊟
              - Neodiapsida
                - †Saurosternon bainii
                - - †Younginidae
                    - †Scyllacerta creanae
                    - - †Akkedops bremneri
                      - †Youngina capensis
                  - - †Tangasauridae
                      - †Acerosodontosaurus piveteaui
                      - - †Hovasaurus boulei
                        - †Thadeosaurus colcanapi
                    - - †Weigeltisauridae
                        ⊞
                        - †Coelurosauravus elivensis
                        - †Weigeltisaurus jaekeli
                        ⊟
                      - - †Claudiosaurus germaini
                        - Reptile crown-group
                          - Archosauromorpha
                          - Lepidosauromorpha

Topology B: Bayesian analysis (alternative relationships of Younginidae + Tangasauridae)

- Parapleurota
  - †Millerettidae
    ⊞
    - †Lanthanolania ivakhnenkoi
    - - †Broomia perplexa
      - - †Milleretta rubidgei
        - †Milleropsis pricei
    ⊟
  - Neodiapsida
    - †Younginiformes
      - †Younginidae
        - †Saurosternon bainii
        - - †Scyllacerta creanae
          - - †Akkedops bremneri
            - †Youngina capensis
      - †Tangasauridae
        - †Acerosodontosaurus piveteaui
        - †Hovasaurus boulei
        - †Thadeosaurus colcanapi
    - - †Weigeltisauridae
        ⊞
        - †Coelurosauravus elivensis
        - †Weigeltisaurus jaekeli
        ⊟
      - - †Claudiosaurus germaini
        - Reptile crown-group
          - Archosauromorpha
          - Lepidosauromorpha

== See also ==
- Evolution of reptiles
- Karoo Supergroup
