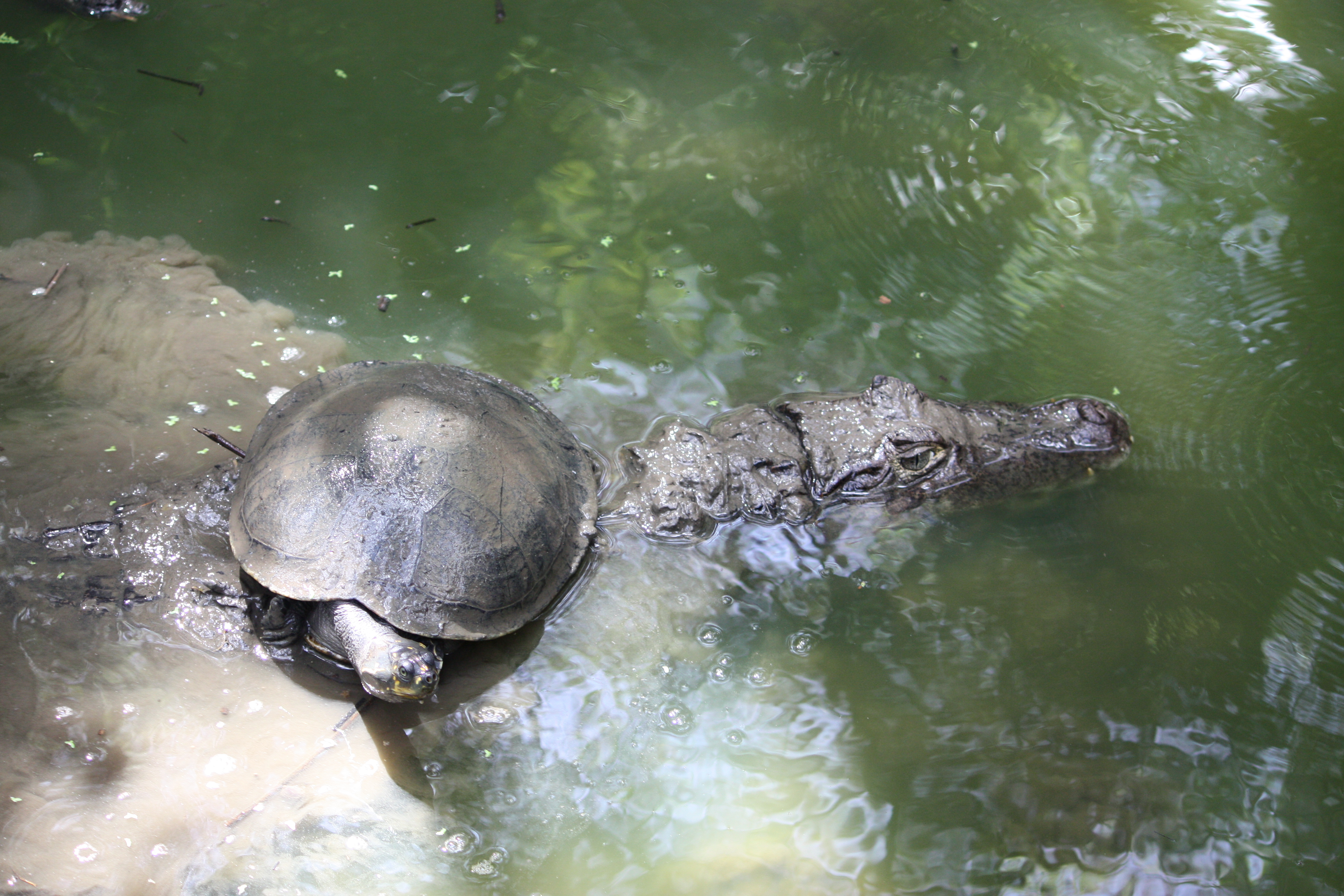
- Podocnemis unifilis on Caiman crocodilus

Scientific classification
- Kingdom: Animalia
- Phylum: Chordata
- Class: Reptilia
- Clade: Parapleurota
- Clade: Neodiapsida
- Clade: Sauria
- Clade: Cataphracta; Latreille, 1825

Extant subtaxa
- Testudines; Crocodilia; Classically excluded but cladistically subtaxon included: Aves

= Cataphracta =

Cataphracta Temporal range: 260–0 Ma Possible Capitanian records.

Paraphyletic grouping of reptiles

Cataphracta (the "shield reptiles") is a near-obsolete grouping of reptiles that comprises the two orders Testudines (turtles) and Crocodilia (crocodilians) by the French zoologist Pierre André Latreille in 1825. The characteristics shared between turtles and crocodilians were noted in the following in a 1831 publication by the British zoologist John Edward Gray:

The reptiles of this division, which was originally proposed by M. Latreille, are distinguished by their tongues being very short and affixed to the sides of the mouth, so that they can scarcely be exserted. The males have a single penis and the females a single vagina, like most other vertebrated animals. Their vent is either a longitudinal slit or a roundish hole. The quadrate bone and the pterygoid processes are included in and form part of the skull. The limbs and tail are covered with large bony scales, and the body is either protected by two shields, formed by the union of the vertebrae, ribs, and sternum into a bony case, and covered with a cartilaginous or horny skin, or by longitudinal rows of bony plates inserted in the skin, and covered with an epidermis which falls off in small pieces. Their lungs are enveloped by the thickened peritoneum, which performs the part and has the appearance of a diaphragm. They are all oviparous, and none of them poisonous; but some, from their large size and carnivorous habits, are dangerous even to man.

Cataphracta, however, soon fell out of use among most subsequent naturalists for a multitude of reasons. Commonly, the usage of the presence or absence of temporal fenestrae in the skull. Turtles have an anapsid skull with no temporal fenestrae. Crocodilians have a diapsid skull with two temporal fenestrae, a feature also shared with lepidosaurs (squamates and the tuatara). As a result, for the longest time, it was assumed that crocodilians shared a common ancestry with lepidosaurs, while turtles occupied a more basal branch of the reptilian tree of life. Furthermore, paleontological, morphological and molecular studies have found crocodilans to be the closet extant sister group to birds in the clade Archosauria.

However, in a series of relatively recent papers using multiple sequence alignments of DNA and protein sequences and phylogenetic inferences have shown that turtles are the closest living relatives to birds and crocodilians. There are about 1000 ultra-conserved elements in the genome that are unique to turtles and archosaurs, but which are not found in lepidosaurs. Other genome-wide analyses also support this grouping. In 2015 the grouping of turtles and archosaurs was given the name Archelosauria by Crawford et al. who defined it as the clade formed by the descendants of the most recent common ancestor of Crocodylus niloticus (the Nile crocodile) and Testudo graeca (the Greek tortoise) A 2021 article by Joyce et al. modified the definition to specifically exclude the lizard Lacerta agilis from the group. Therefore, Archelosauria is the more preferred name for the turtle-crocodilian/archosaur clade.
