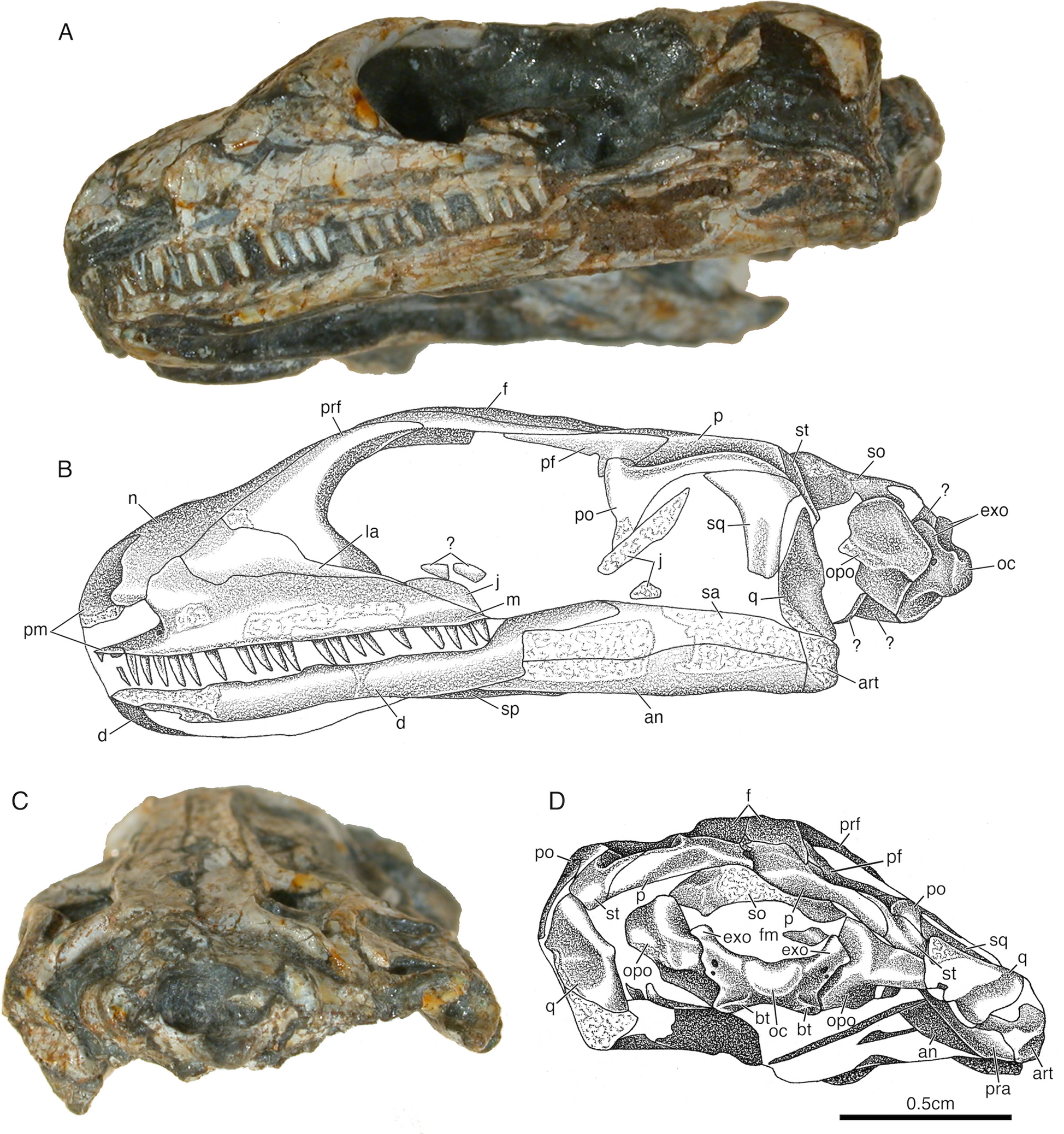
- Holotype skull in lateral (side) (A, B) and occipital (braincase) (C, D) views

Scientific classification
- Kingdom: Animalia
- Phylum: Chordata
- Class: Reptilia
- Family: †Younginidae (?)
- Genus: †Akkedops; Mooney, Scott & Reisz, 2025
- Species: †A. bremneri

Binomial name
- †Akkedops bremneri Mooney, Scott & Reisz, 2025

= Akkedops =

Akkedops Temporal range: Late Permian

Genus of extinct early sauropsids

Akkedops is an extinct genus of early neodiapsid sauropsids known from the Late Permian Cistecephalus Assemblage Zone of South Africa. The genus contains a single species, Akkedops bremneri, known from a single skull.

== Discovery and naming ==
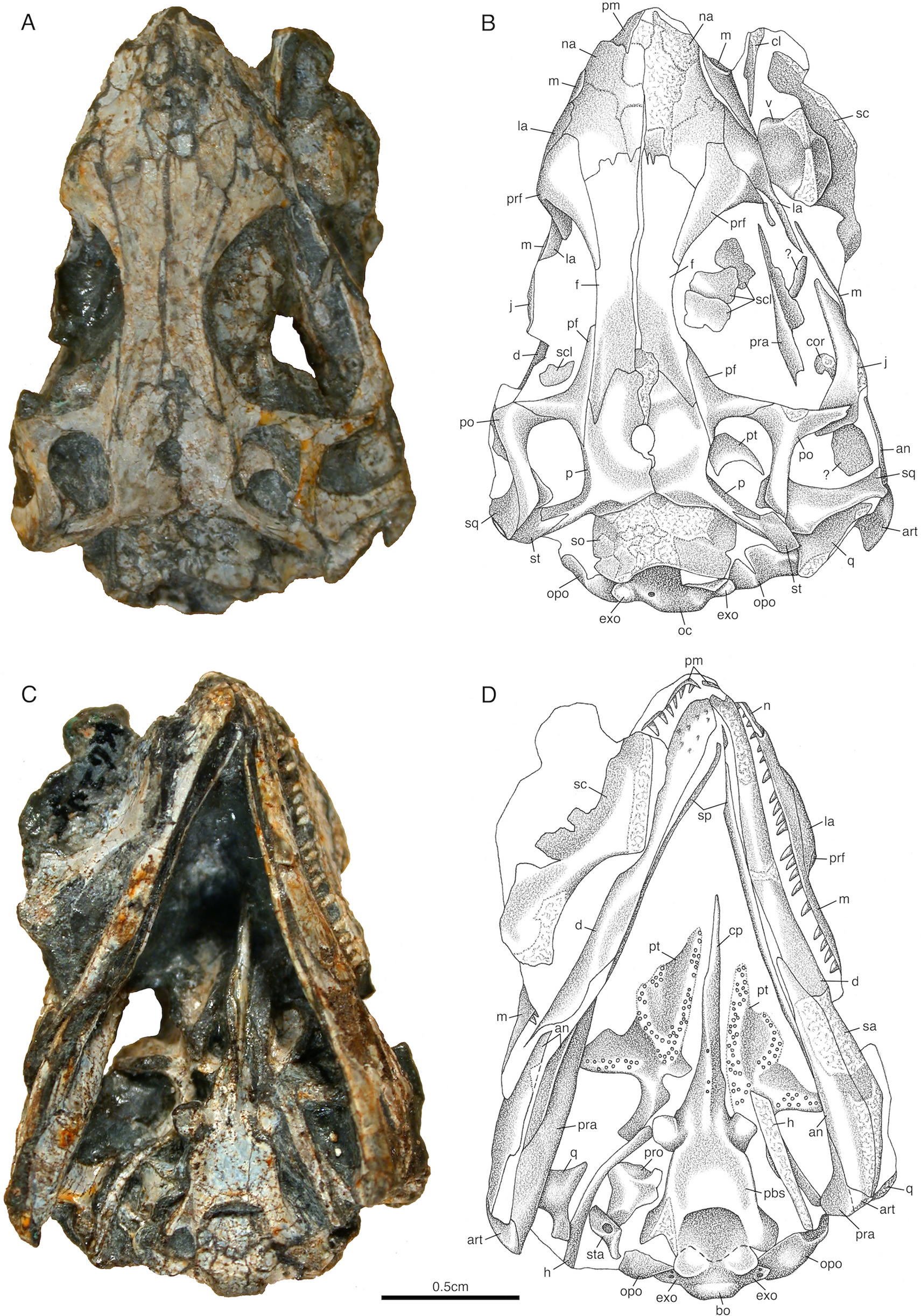
Holotype skull in dorsal (top) (A, B) and ventral (bottom) (C, D) views

The Akkedops holotype specimen, SAM-PK-K6205, was discovered by D. T. Bremner in the 1980s in outcrops of the Beaufort Group (Karoo Supergroup), representing part of the Cistecephalus Assemblage Zone, in South Africa. The specimen consists of a single, nearly complete skull with associated postcranial fragments. The specimen is somewhat crushed and distorted.

In 2025, Ethan D. Mooney, Diane Scott, and Robert R. Reisz described Akkedops bremneri as a new genus and species of early neodiapsids based on these fossil remains. The generic name, Akkedops, combines the Afrikaans word akkedis, meaning "lizard", with the Greek suffix opsis, meaning appearance, in reference to the superficially lizard-like morphology of the preserved material. The specific name, bremneri, honors the discoverer of the holotype specimen.

Mooney and colleagues also referred two other specimens to Akkedops based on alleged similarities in their anatomy and discovery locality: BP/1/2614, an additional nearly complete but crushed skull, and SAM-PK-K7710, an aggregation of at least six partial individuals originally described as juveniles of the related Youngina. In their 2025 redescription of Galesphyrus, a fellow Permian South African sauropsid, Buffa and colleagues questioned the referral of SAM-PK-K7710 to Akkedops, and restricted their phylogenetic scoring of this taxon to just the holotype, SAM-PK-K6205. In 2026, Jenkins and colleagues redescibed SAM-PK-K7710 as belonging to a new genus and species, Scyllacerta creanae. These authors noted that, contrary to statements by Mooney and colleagues that the three 'Akkedops' specimens came from the same locality in the Endothiodon Assemblage Zone (EAZ), the Akkedops holotype is actually from the Cistecephalus AZ, Scyllacerta is from the EAZ, and BP/1/2614 is from the Daptocephalus AZ, separating the three specimens by millions of years.

== Classification ==
To test the relationships of Akkedops, Mooney, Scott & Reisz (2025) scored this taxon in the data matrix of Buffa et al. (2024). This phylogenetic analysis placed Akkedops as the sister taxon to Sauria (crown-group reptiles) within the Neodiapsida, diverging after Youngina. These results are displayed in Topology A below. Later in 2025, Buffa, Jenkins, and Benoit published an extensively updated and expanded version of this phylogenetic matrix, incorporating the A. bremneri holotype and SAM-PK-K7710 as separate OTUs (operational taxonomic units). Their results supported the placement of these two specimens as sister taxa within a monophyletic Younginidae, also including Youngina, with multiple additional lineages between this clade and the reptile crown-group. These results are displayed in Topology B below.

Topology A: Mooney et al. (2025) tree

- Neodiapsida
  - - Mesosaurus tenuidens
    - Weigeltisauridae
      ⊞
      - Coelurosauravus elivensis
      - Rautiania spp.
      - Weigeltisaurus jaekeli
      ⊟
  - - - Claudiosaurus germaini
      - Hovasaurus boulei
    - - Acerosodontosaurus piveteaui
      - - Youngina capensis
        - - Akkedops bremneri
          - Sauria
            - Archosauromorpha
            - Lepidosauromorpha

Topology B: Buffa et al. (2025) tree

- Neodiapsida
  - Younginidae
    - Youngina capensis
    - - Akkedops bremneri
      - Scyllacerta creanae
  - - Tangasauridae
      ⊞
      - Kenyasaurus mariakaniensis
      - - Acerosodontosaurus piveteaui
        - - Thadeosaurus colcanapi
          - - Hovasaurus boulei
            - Tangasaurus mennelli
      ⊟
    - - - Claudiosaurus germaini
        - Weigeltisauridae
          ⊞
          - Coelurosauravus elivensis
          - Rautiania spp.
          - Weigeltisaurus jaekeli
          ⊟
      - Sauria
        - Archosauromorpha
        - Lepidosauromorpha

In their 2026 description of Scyllacerta (SAM-PK-K7710), Jenkins and colleagues similarly recovered this specimen, Akkedops, and Youngina within a monophyletic Younginidae, albeit with the latter two genera as sister taxa.
