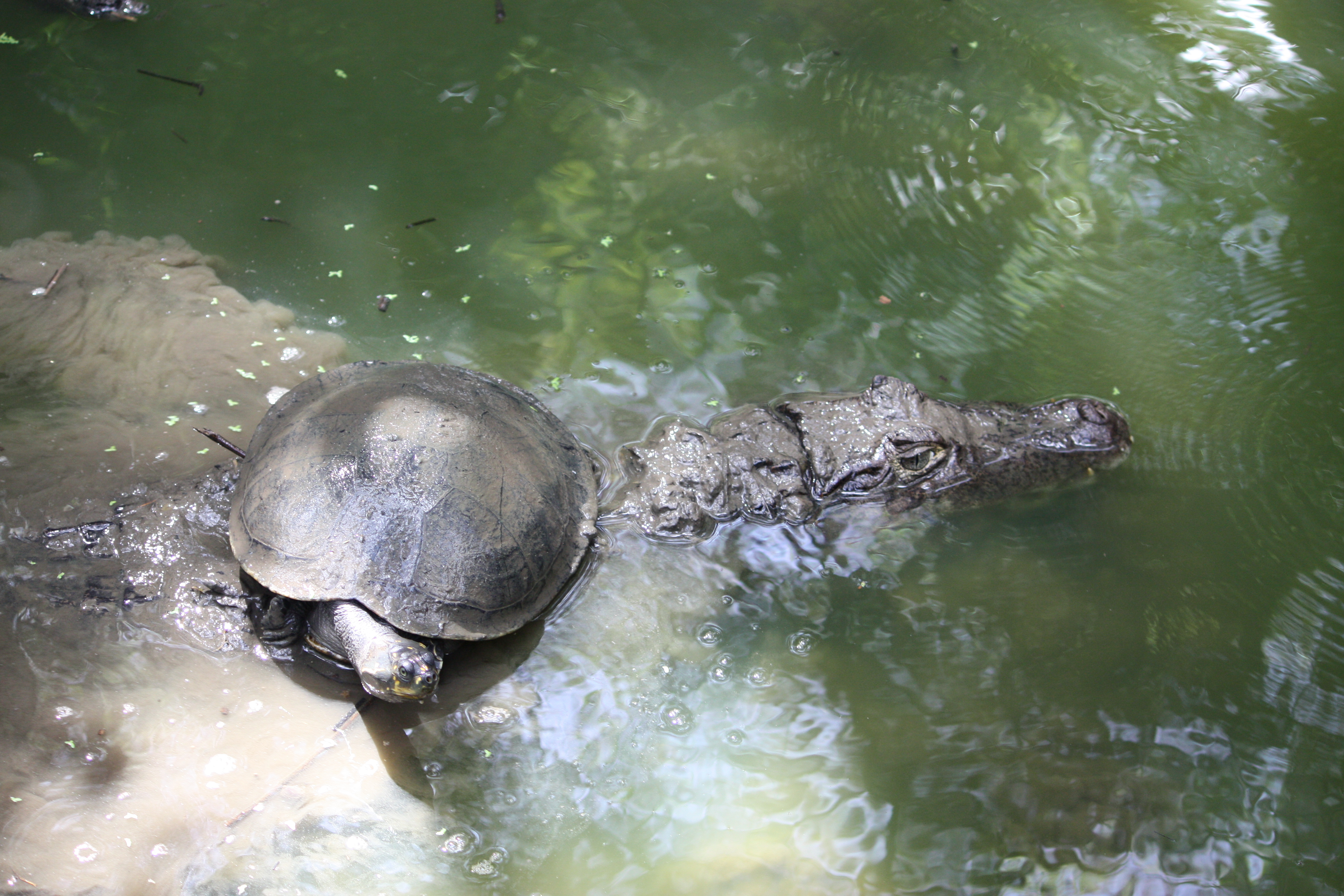
- Podocnemis unifilis (a turtle) on Caiman crocodilus (an archosaur)

Scientific classification
- Kingdom: Animalia
- Phylum: Chordata
- Class: Reptilia
- Clade: Archosauromorpha
- Clade: Archelosauria; Crawford et al., 2015

Subgroups
- Pantestudines (turtles and their extinct relatives); ? Archosauromorpha (archosaurs and their extinct relatives; Archelosauria may instead be nested within Archosauromorpha); ? †Ichthyosauromorpha (ichthyosaurs and relatives); ? †Sauropterygia (plesiosaurs and relatives); ? †Thalattosauria

= Archelosauria =

Archelosaurs Temporal range: 260–0 Ma Possible Capitanian records.

Clade comprising turtles, birds and crocodilians

Archelosauria is a clade grouping turtles and archosaurs (birds and crocodilians) and their closest relatives, to the exclusion of lepidosaurs (the clade containing lizards, snakes and the tuatara). Most phylogenetic analyses based on molecular data (e.g. DNA and proteins) have supported a sister-group relationship between turtles and archosaurs. On the other hand, Archelosauria had not been historically supported by most morphological analyses, which have instead found turtles to either be descendants of parareptiles, early-diverging diapsids outside of Sauria, or close relatives of lepidosaurs within the clade Ankylopoda. More recent morphological analyses have found strong morphological support for Archelosauria (and Pantestudines to be nested within Archosauromorpha).

== Classification ==
Multiple sequence alignments of DNA and protein sequences and phylogenetic inferences have shown that turtles are the closest living relatives to birds and crocodilians. There are about 1000 ultra-conserved elements in the genome that are unique to turtles and archosaurs, but which are not found in lepidosaurs. Other genome-wide analyses also support this grouping.

Archelosauria was named in a 2015 article by Crawford et al. The name is meant to evoke the archosaurs and chelonians (turtles), the two living subgroups of the clade. Crawford et al. defined Archelosauria as the clade formed by the descendants of the most recent common ancestor of Crocodylus niloticus (the Nile crocodile) and Testudo graeca (the Greek tortoise). A 2021 article by Joyce et al. modified the definition to specifically exclude the lizard Lacerta agilis from the group.

Below is the phylogeny from Crawford et al., showing interrelationships of Testudines at family level down to Durocryptodira. Archelosauria was grouped within Sauria (the clade formed by archosaurs and lepidosaurs), as the sister branch to Lepidosauria, the clade containing lizards, snakes and the tuatara.

- Sauria
  - Lepidosauria
    - Rhynchocephalia
    - Squamata
      - "Lacertilia"
      - Serpentes
  - Archelosauria
    - Testudines
      - Pleurodira
        - Chelidae
        - Pelomedusoides
          - Pelomedusidae
          - Podocnemididae
      - Cryptodira
        - Trionychia
          - Carettochelyidae
          - Trionychidae
        - Durocryptodira
    - Archosauria
      - Crocodilia
      - Aves

Until recently, analyses based on morphological data have generally recovered turtles either as non-diapsid reptiles nested within Parareptilia (a group of basal reptiles that lived from the Carboniferous to the Triassic), as early-diverging diapsids outside of Sauria, or as close relatives of Lepidosauria. The hypothetical clade formed by turtles and lepidosaurs to the exclusion of archosaurs is known as Ankylopoda. A 2022 analysis by Simões et al. found a monophyletic Archelosauria using only morphological data for the first time although not in the majority of their analyses, thus agreeing with most molecular analyses, a finding that was later corroborated by Jenkins et al. in 2026 with more anatomical evidence. Archelosauria was diagnosed by two unambiguous synapomorphies (shared derived traits): a sagittal crest on the supraoccipital bone, and the lack of an entepicondylar foramen on the humerus. A cladogram adapted from their analysis is shown below:

- Neodiapsida
  - Younginiformes
  - - Eunotosaurus
    - - Coelurosauravus
      - Sauria
        - Lepidosauromorpha
          - Sphenodontia
          - Squamata
        - Archelosauria
          - Testudines
            - Pappochelys
            - - Odontochelys
              - - Kayentachelys
                - Proganochelys
          - Archosauromorpha
            - - Ichthyosauromorpha
              - - Sauropterygia
                - Thalattosauria
            - - Protorosauria
              - - - Allokotosauria
                  - Rhynchosauria
                - - Prolacerta
                  - Archosauriformes

Wolniewicz et al. (2023) also found evidence for an expanded Archelosauria containing the three Mesozoic marine reptile clades of uncertain placement, although this was only poorly supported.

In their parsimony analysis, Jenkins et al. 2026 found Pantestudines to be nested within Archosauromorpha with strong morphological support, more closely related to modern archosaurs than to classic early archosauromorph Protorosaurus, suggesting that the ancestor of Pantestudines was "protorosaurian"-like, which is supported by some anatomical features of early Pantestudines. They also found the Permian reptile Eunotosaurus, sometimes considered to be an early turtle relative, to be a millerettid stem-reptile unrelated to Pantestudines.

- Sauropsida
  - †Araeoscelidia
  - - †Bolosauridae
    - - †Ankyramorpha
        - †Acleistorhinidae
        - †Procolophonia
          - †Pareiasauromorpha
          - †Procolophonoidea
      - - †Mesosauria
        - - - †Ascendonanus
            - †Orovenator
            - †Cabarzia
          - Parapleurota
            - †Millerettidae (including Eunotosaurus)
            - Neodiapsida
              - †Saurosternon
              - - †Younginidae
                - - †Tangasauridae
                  - - †Claudiosaurus
                    - - †Weigeltisauridae
                      - †Drepanosauromorpha
                      - Sauria Reptilia s. s.
                        - Lepidosauromorpha
                        - Archosauromorpha
                          - †Sauropterygia (including Plesiosauria)
                          - - †Protorosaurus
                            - Archelosauria
                              - Pantestudines
                              - - †Tanystropheidae
                                - Crocopoda
                                  - †Prolacerta
                                  - - †Allokotosauria
                                    - - †Rhynchosauria
                                      - - †Teyujagua
                                        - Archosauriformes (including Archosauria)
