= Heleosuchus =

Heleosuchus Temporal range: Late Permian

Scientific classification
- Kingdom: Animalia
- Phylum: Chordata
- Class: Reptilia
- Clade: Neodiapsida
- Genus: †Heleosuchus; Broom, 1907

Species
- Heleosaurus griesbachi Owen, 1876

Extinct genus of reptiles

Heleosuchus is an extinct genus of diapsid reptile from the Late Permian of South Africa. It was originally described as a species of Saurosternon by Richard Owen. The type species is Saurosternon griesbachi. The specific name honours Carl Ludolf Griesbach. It was later recognized as a separate genus by Robert Broom.

At one time, the type specimen of Heleosuchus was thought to be lost. However, it remains at the Natural History Museum, Vienna, where it is numbered NHMW 2374, while the Natural History Museum (formerly British Museum (Natural History)) possesses a cast numbered R. 5000. Several other casts of NHMW 2374 are present in several other European institutions, among them a cast of higher fidelity to the original.

While the type was thought to be lost, Susan E. Evans redescribed this taxon on the basis of an older mold which had been taken of the type specimen prior to its disappearance. When the specimen appeared in later years, a higher quality mold was taken and described by Robert L. Carroll that allowed a better description of this taxon.

Heleosuchus is only known from the posterior half of the skull and a cervicodorsal column with some associated forearm elements and hindlimb elements. The hindlimbs are better preserved than the forearms.

Heleosuchus is suggested as being either an early diapsid reptile, not closely related to other lineages, or as being an aberrant and primitive lepidosauromorph. Heleosuchus shares the hooked fifth metatarsal found in some other diapsids, such as primitive turtles (Odontochelys), lepidosauromorphs, and archosauromorphs, but it also resembles "younginiform"-grade diapsids in its gross morphology. Heleosuchus may also share a thyroid fenestra with these higher diapsid reptiles as well, but the identity of this feature is disputed.

== See also ==
- Heleosaurus - Both Heleosaurus and Heleosuchus were at one time thought to be diapsid reptiles.
- Youngina - Heleosuchus was once suggested as being a relative of Youngina, but this view has been summarily dismissed in subsequent literature (Carroll, 1987; Evans, 1984).
