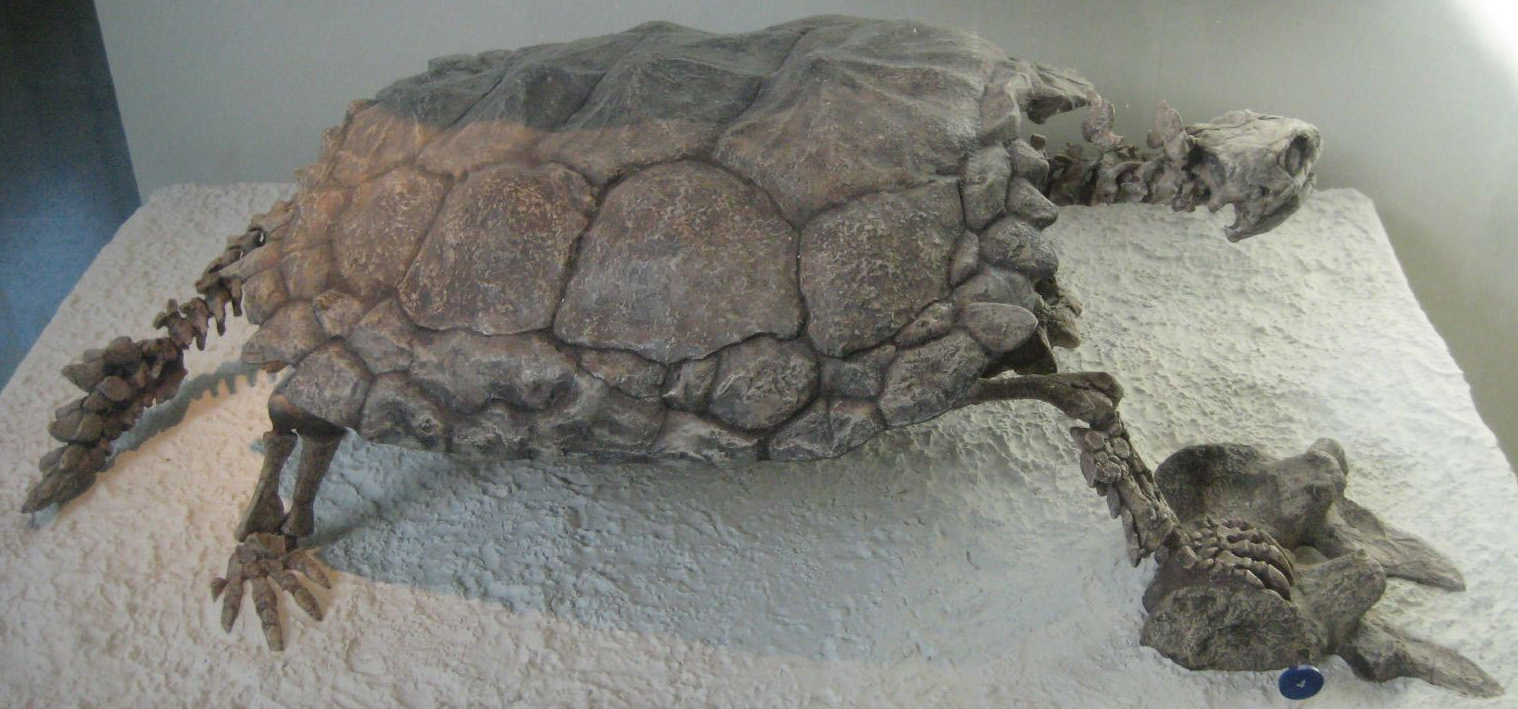
- Proganochelys quenstedti

Scientific classification (obsolete)
- Kingdom: Animalia
- Phylum: Chordata
- Class: Reptilia
- Clade: Sauria
- (unranked): Ankylopoda; Lyson et al., 2012

Extant subclades
- Pantestudines; Lepidosauromorpha

= Ankylopoda =

Ankylopods Temporal range: Earliest Triassic - Holocene 252–0 Ma

Former group of reptiles

Ankylopoda was a proposed clade that hypothetically contains turtles and lepidosaurs (tuatara, lizards and snakes) and their fossil relatives. This clade was historically supported based on microRNA analysis as well as some morphological cladistic analyses. However, it was strongly contradicted by molecular evidence which supports Archelosauria (the grouping of turtles and archosaurs), as well as recent morphological analyses.

== Classification ==
The cladogram below is an example of a morpholgoical evidence only fossil evidence, published by Rainer Schoch and Hans-Dieter Sues in 2015. This study found the putative stem turtle Eunotosaurus (now recognized as a millerettid stem reptile) to be an early stem-turtle, though later versions of this Schoch and Sues analysis found weak support for it among "parareptiles".

- Sauria
  - Archosauromorpha
  - Ankylopoda/Lepidosauromorpha
    - - †Kuehneosauridae
      - Lepidosauria
        - Squamata
        - Rhynchocephalia
    - Pantestudines?
      - †Sauropterygia
        - †Eosauropterygia
        - - †Sinosaurosphargis
          - †Placodontia
      - - †Eunotosaurus
        - - †Pappochelys
          - - †Odontochelys
            - Testudinata
              - †Proganochelys
              - Testudines

== See also ==
- Archelosauria, an alternative clade that places turtles as sister taxon to archosaurs.
