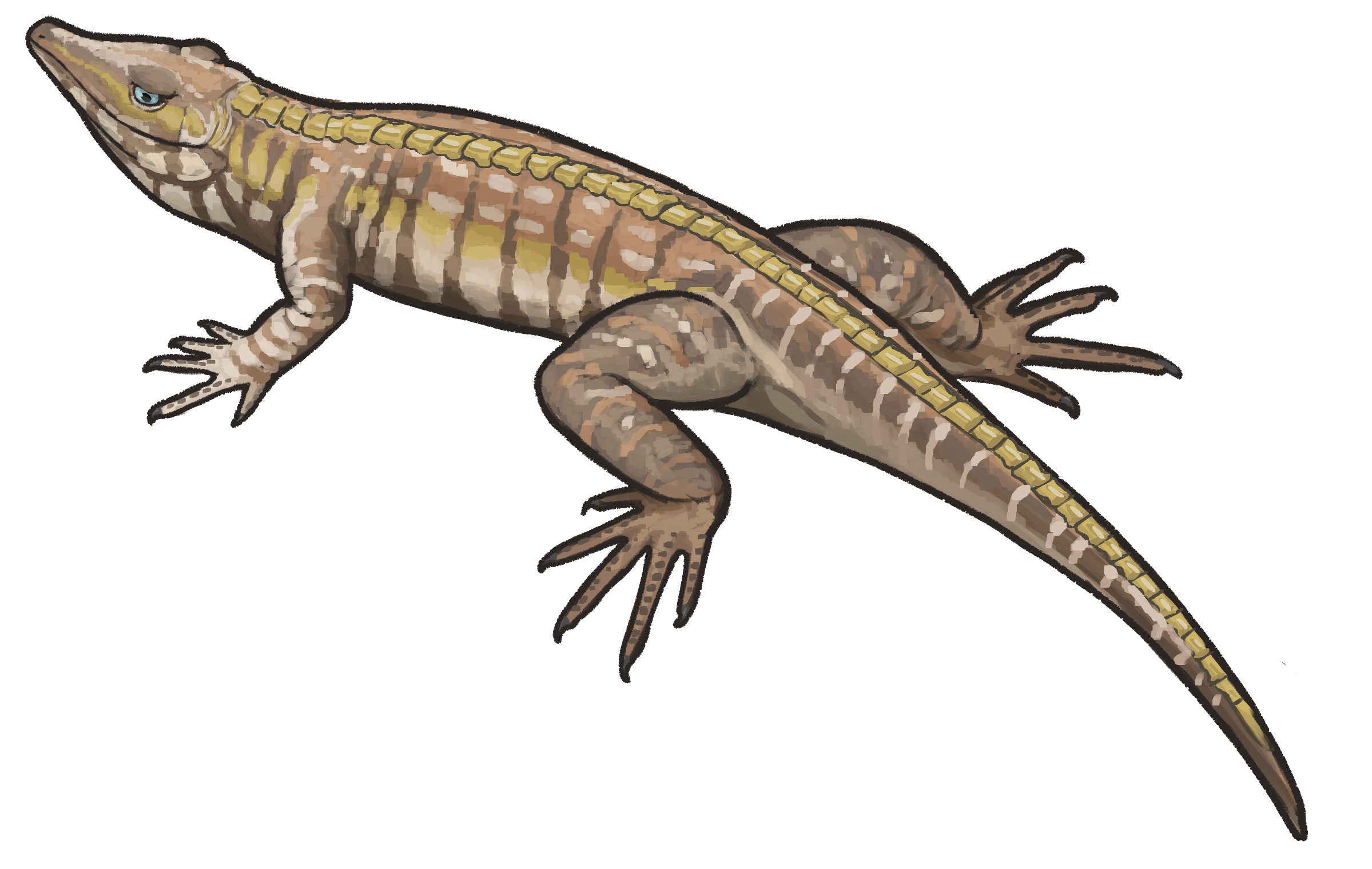
- Life restoration of Youngina

Scientific classification
- Kingdom: Animalia
- Phylum: Chordata
- Class: Reptilia
- Clade: Parapleurota
- Clade: Neodiapsida
- Family: †Younginidae; Broom, 1914

Genera
- †Akkedops; †Scyllacerta; †Youngina

= Younginidae =

Younginidae Temporal range: Late Permian

Extinct family of reptiles

Younginidae is an extinct family of diapsid reptiles known from the Late Permian. In a phylogenetic context, younginids are placed near the base of the clade Neodiapsida. Three species are definitive members of the Younginidae: Youngina capensis, Akkedops bremneri, and Scyllacerta creanae, all from the Late Permian of South Africa. Several other genera have historically been assigned to this family, though more recent phylogenetic analyses have supported relationships with other clades. Heleosuchus griesbachi from the Late Permian of South Africa may also be a member of the family.

Younginidae was traditionally assigned to Eosuchia, an order containing an assemblage of basal diapsids now thought to represent an evolutionary grade rather than a true clade. In 1945 paleontologist Alfred Romer reclassified Younginidae within a new group, Younginiformes, grouping it with the families Tangasauridae and Prolacertidae. Romer considered Younginidae to include many genera that are no longer classified as younginids: Paliguana, Palaeagama, and Saurosternon are now considered basal lepidosauromorphs, Galesphyrus and Heleosuchus are diapsids of uncertain affinities (incertae sedis), Heleophilus is now a millerettid, and Heleosaurus is now thought to be a varanopid synapsid. The validity of Younginiformes as a monophyletic clade is contested; the phylogenetic analysis of Reisz et al. (2011) placed younginids close to Sauria, the clade including the still-living archosauromorph and lepidosauromorph reptiles, while the 'younginiform' family Tangasauridae takes a more basal position in Neodiapsida. Below is a cladogram from that analysis:

- - Captorhinidae
  - Diapsida
    - Araeoscelidia
    - Neodiapsida
      - Orovenator
      - - Lanthanolania
        - - Tangasauridae
            - Tangasaurus
            - - Acerosodontosaurus
              - Hovasaurus
          - - Younginidae
              - Thadeosaurus
              - Youngina
            - - Claudiosaurus
              - Sauria
                - Archosauromorpha
                - Lepidosauromorpha

Implied weighting analysis after Jenkins et al. 2026:

- Reptile total-group
  - †Araeoscelidia
  - - †Bolosauridae
    - - †Erpetonyx arsenaultorum
      - Neoreptilia
        - †Ankyramorpha
          ⊞
          - †Acleistorhinidae
          - - †Pareiasauromorpha
            - †Procolophonoidea
          ⊟
        - - †Mesosauridae
          - - - †Orovenator mayorum
              - - †Ascendonanus nestleri
                - †Cabarzia trostheidei
            - Parapleurota
              - †Millerettidae
              - Neodiapsida
                - †Saurosternon bainii
                - - †Younginidae
                    - †Scyllacerta creanae
                    - - †Akkedops bremneri
                      - †Youngina capensis
                  - - †Tangasauridae
                      - †Acerosodontosaurus piveteaui
                      - - †Hovasaurus boulei
                        - †Thadeosaurus colcanapi
                    - - †Weigeltisauridae
                      - - †Claudiosaurus germaini
                        - Reptile crown-group
                          - Archosauromorpha
                          - Lepidosauromorpha
