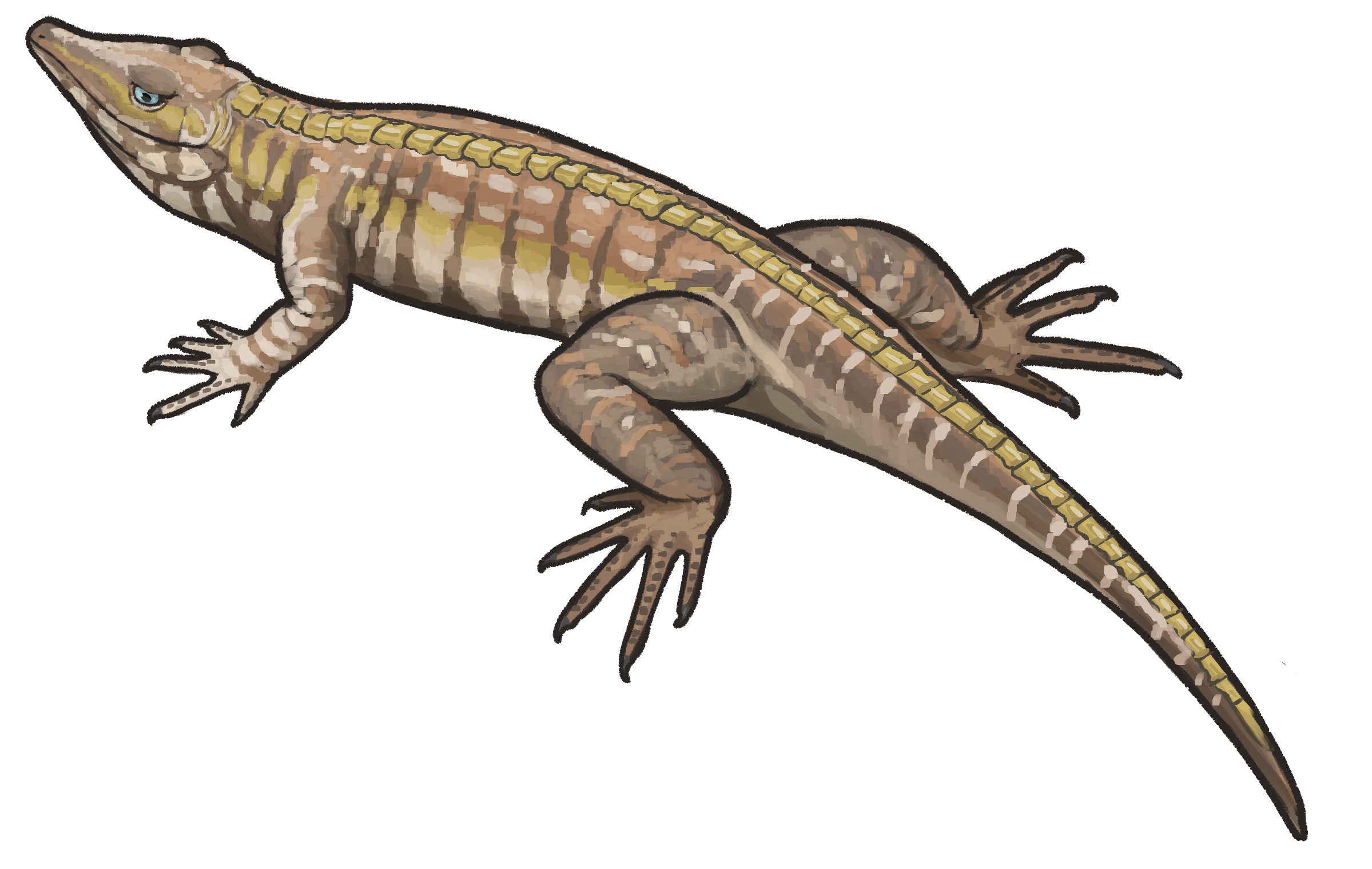
- Speculative life restoration

Scientific classification
- Kingdom: Animalia
- Phylum: Chordata
- Class: Reptilia
- Clade: Parapleurota
- Clade: Neodiapsida
- Family: †Younginidae
- Genus: †Youngina; Broom 1914

Type species
- †Youngina capensis Broom 1914

= Youngina =

Youngina Temporal range: Late Permian, 259.9–254.17 Ma

Extinct genus of reptiles

Youngina (named after John Young (1823–1900)) is an extinct genus of small, lizard-like stem-group reptile from the Late Permian Beaufort Group (Cistecephalus–Daptocephalus assemblage zones) of the Karoo Supergroup of South Africa. Youngina has been the subject of considerable scientific attention due to its basal position within Neodiapsida (having diverged before the last common ancestor of all living reptiles) and its well-preserved skulls, with Youngina seen as providing insight into the plesiomorphic (ancestral) morphology of the last common ancestor of living reptiles.

== History ==
The holotype, a skull and associated vertebrae, was discovered by Robert Broom near Nieu-Bethesda, Cape Colony (now South Africa) and he published his brief description of Youngina capensis in 1914. Another well-preserved skull was described by Olsen (1936).

SAM-PK-K7710, an aggregation of several small, articulated reptiles embedded in siltstone, was assigned to Youngina by Smith & Evans (1995) and regarded as a representative of this species for many years. It was moved to its own species, Scyllacerta creanae, by Jenkins et al. (2026).

== Description ==
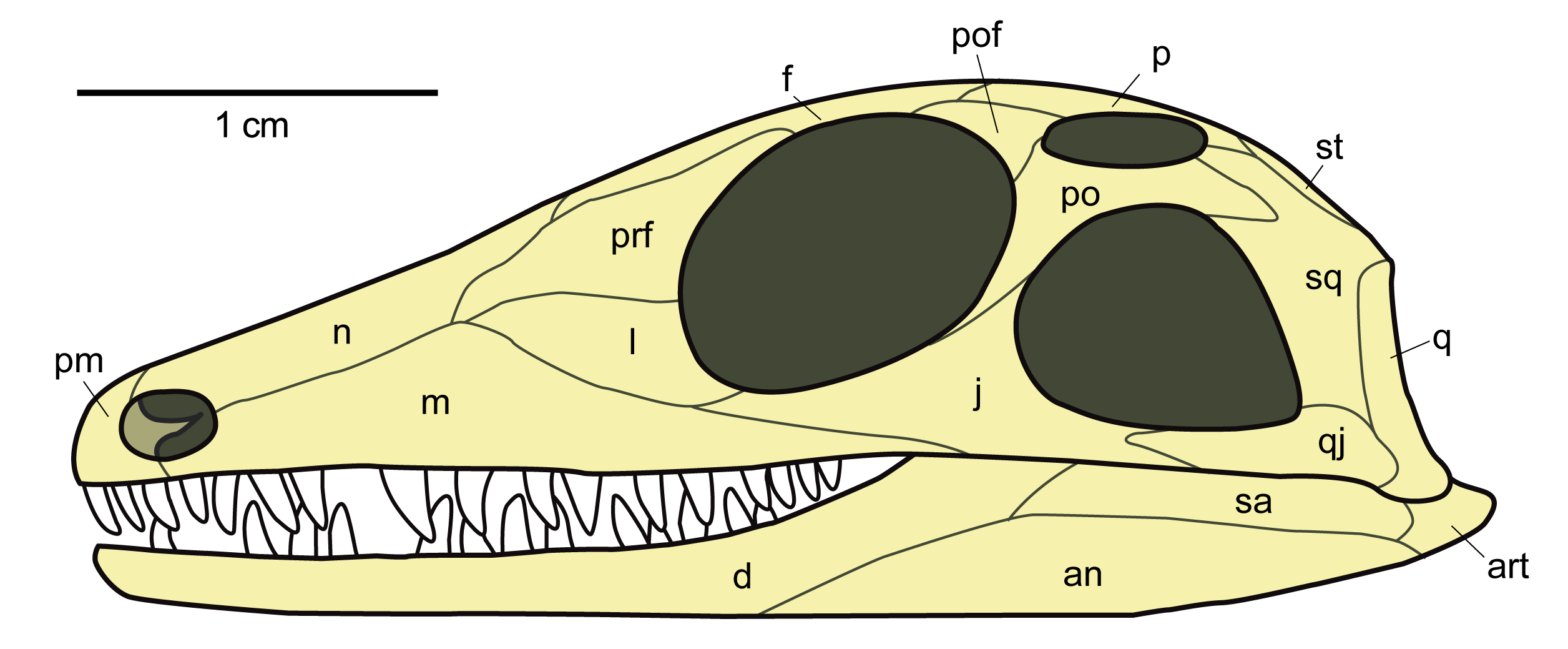
Reconstructed skull. Key: an = angular, art = articular, d = dentary, f = frontal, j = jugal, l = lacrimal, m = maxilla, n = nasal, p = parietal, pm = premaxilla, po = postorbital, pof = postfrontal, prf = prefrontal, q = quadrate, qj = quadratojugal, sa = surangular, sq = squamosal, st = supratemporal.

Size compared to a human hand

Youngina was a relatively small reptile, with a skull length of 5 centimetres (2.0 in) and a total body length of 30 centimetres (12 in). The braincase anatomy of the holotype skull was redescribed in 2010 based on CT scans. Youngina shows a mosaic of features found in more primitive diapsids and more derived taxa such as archosauromorphs and lepidosauromorphs suggesting a non-orthogenetic evolution of these characters. Though the palatobasal articulation is open, it was probably immobile, similar to the skull of the tuatara, contrary to some earlier claims made about the metakinetic mobility of basicranial joints in Youngina and other early diapsid reptiles. Akin to the tuatara, Youngina has a closed lower temporal fenestra caused by a contact between the jugal and quadratojugal bones of the skull forming a complete temporal bar/arcade. While this has historically been suggested as the ancestral condition for (neo)diapsids, at least some other younginids like Scyllacerta, as well as close relatives of neodiapsids like some millerettids have an open lower fenestra where the quadratojugal and jugal do not contact, suggesting that this may be a derived trait in Youngina rather than representing the ancestral neodiapsid condition.

In 2023, Hunt et al. described the palate and mandible of another skull referred to Youngina, BP/1/2871. These authors used this new data to determine Youngina is likely more basal than previously thought in relation to crown-group reptiles.

== Taxonomy and phylogeny ==
Youngina is known from several specimens. Many of these were attributed to as separate genera and species (such as Youngoides and Youngopsis), but it was later realized that they were not distinct from Y. capensis. The "Youngoides romeri" specimen was first attributed to Youngina, but later given its eponymous and separate designation in a later paper. Acanthotoposaurus is also a junior synonym of Youngina.

Youngina is currently placed in the family Younginidae, which comprises the earliest diverging members of Neodiapsida that lie outside of Sauria, the clade that contains all living reptiles (and birds). Youngina was historically placed within the group "Eosuchia" by authors such as Alfred Sherwood Romer alongside various other Permian-Triassic reptile groups like the millerettids, thalattosaurs, rhynchocephalians and rhynchosaurs, which are now thought to form a paraphyletic group of unrelated reptiles. Youngina was later placed with the group Younginiformes alongside other Permian-Triassic lizard-like diapsid reptiles from East Africa and Madagascar, including Acerosodontosaurus, Kenyasaurus, Hovasaurus, Thadeosaurus, and Tangasaurus. However, the monophyly of this group has been strongly questioned, and the group as a whole has often been recovered as paraphyletic. Below is a cladogram from the analysis of Reisz et al. (2011) showing the phylogenetic position of Youngina among early diapsids and a paraphyletic "Younginiformes".

- - Captorhinidae
  - Diapsida
    - Araeoscelidia
    - Neodiapsida
      - Orovenator
      - - Lanthanolania
        - - Tangasauridae
            - Tangasaurus
            - - Acerosodontosaurus
              - Hovasaurus
          - - Younginidae
              - Thadeosaurus
              - Youngina
            - - Claudiosaurus
              - Sauria
                - Archosauromorpha
                - Lepidosauromorpha

Implied weighting analysis after Jenkins et al. 2026:

- Reptile total-group
  - †Araeoscelidia
  - - †Bolosauridae
    - - †Erpetonyx arsenaultorum
      - Neoreptilia
        - †Ankyramorpha
          ⊞
          - †Acleistorhinidae
          - - †Pareiasauromorpha
            - †Procolophonoidea
          ⊟
        - - †Mesosauridae
          - - - †Orovenator mayorum
              - - †Ascendonanus nestleri
                - †Cabarzia trostheidei
            - Parapleurota
              - †Millerettidae
              - Neodiapsida
                - †Saurosternon bainii
                - - †Younginidae
                    - †Scyllacerta creanae
                    - - †Akkedops bremneri
                      - †Youngina capensis
                  - - †Tangasauridae
                      - †Acerosodontosaurus piveteaui
                      - - †Hovasaurus boulei
                        - †Thadeosaurus colcanapi
                    - - †Weigeltisauridae
                      - - †Claudiosaurus germaini
                        - Reptile crown-group
                          - Archosauromorpha
                          - Lepidosauromorpha
