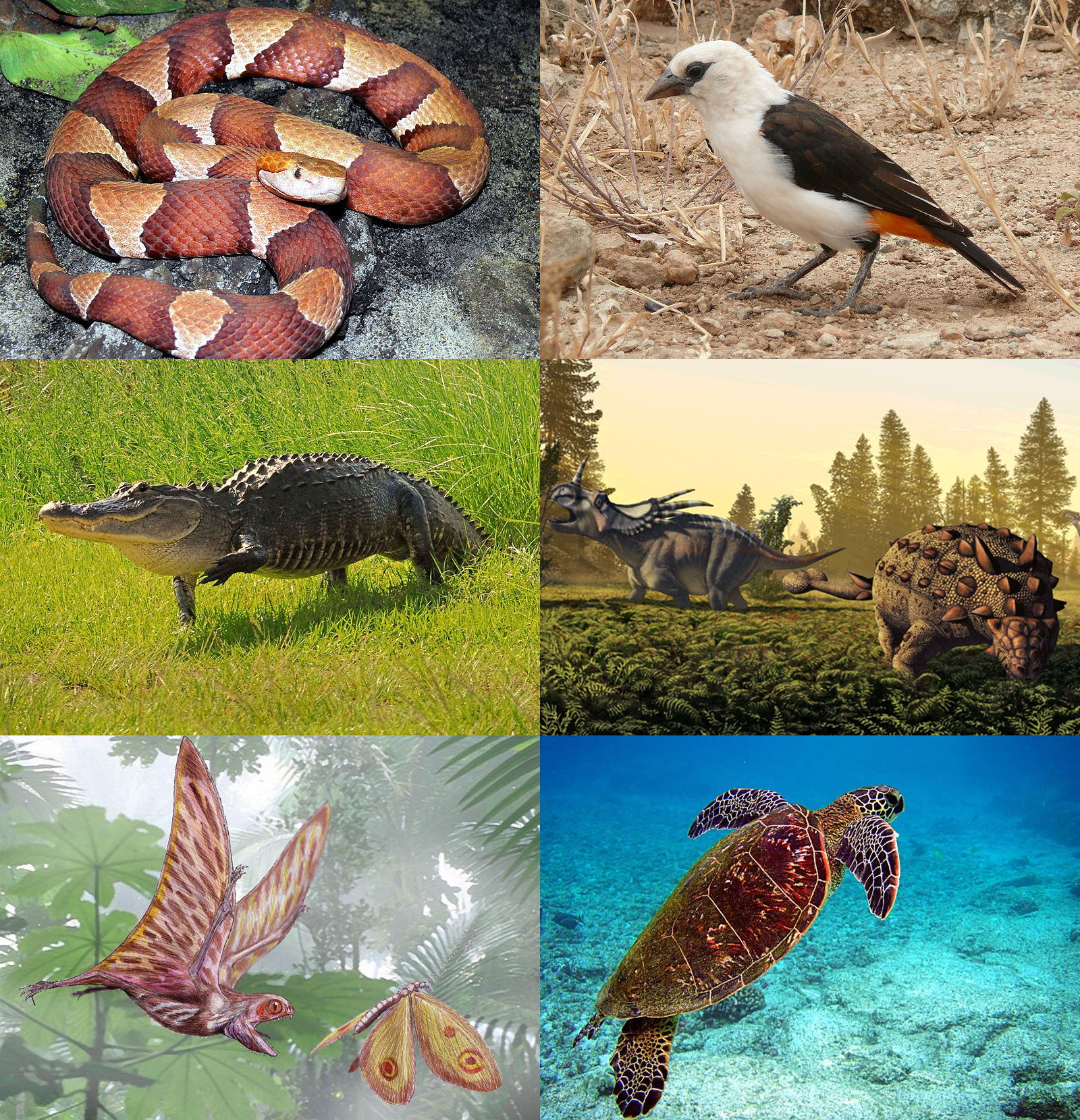
- clockwise from top left: Agkistrodon contortrix (the copperhead, a snake), Dinemellia dinemelli (the white-faced buffalo-weaver, a bird), various extinct ornithischian dinosaurs, Chelonia mydas (the green sea turtle), Anurognathus (an extinct pterosaur), and Alligator mississippiensis (the american alligator, a crocodilian)

Scientific classification
- Kingdom: Animalia
- Phylum: Chordata
- Class: Reptilia
- Clade: Neodiapsida
- Clade: Sauria; Macartney, 1802

Groups
- Lepidosauromorpha (includes the tuatara, lizards, snakes, and various extinct taxa); Archelosauria; Archosauromorpha (includes crocodilians, dinosaurs (including birds), and various extinct taxa); Pantestudines (includes turtles); †Kuehneosauridae; †Choristodera?; †Sauropterygiformes?; †Ichthyosauromorpha?; †Thalattosauria?

Synonyms
- Reptilia sensu stricto

= Sauria =

Saurians Temporal range: Lopingian–Present, 260–0 Ma Suspected Middle Permian origin

Clade of reptiles

Sauria is the clade of diapsids containing the most recent common ancestor of Archosauria (which includes crocodilians and birds) and Lepidosauria (which includes squamates and the tuatara), and all its descendants. Since most molecular phylogenies recover turtles as more closely related to archosaurs than to lepidosaurs as part of Archelosauria, Sauria likely contains all living reptiles and can be considered the reptile crown group, and may therefore be synonymous with Reptilia under some definitions. Sauria may also include other major extinct reptile groups, such as the marine reptile clades Sauropterygia, Ichthyosauromorpha, and Thalattosauria.

Sauria lies within the larger total group Sauropsida, which also contains various stem-reptiles which are more closely related to reptiles than to mammals. Prior to its modern usage, "Sauria" was used as a name for the suborder occupied by lizards, which included crocodilians in 18th century classifications.

== Systematics ==
Sauria was historically used as a partial equivalent for Squamata (which contains lizards and snakes). The redefinition to cover the last common ancestor of archosaurs and lepidosaurs was the result of papers by Jacques Gauthier and colleagues in the 1980s.

Genomic studies and comprehensive studies in the fossil record suggest that turtles are closely related to archosaurs as part of Sauria, and not to the non-saurian parareptiles as previously thought.

=== Synapomorphies ===
The synapomorphies or characters that unite the clade Sauria also help them be distinguished from other stem reptiles and early sauropsids in the following categories based on the following regions of the body. Note that most recent work has found that many features previously recognized as saurian characters are widespread in crownward stem reptile groups such as millerettids and neodiapsids.

- Skull region
  - Dorsal origin of temporal musculature (shared with all neodiapsids)
  - Postparietal absent
  - Tabular bone lost
  - Stapes lacking a foramen
  - Anterior inferior process of the prootic present
- Trunk region
  - Sacral ribs oriented laterally
  - Ontogenetic fusion of caudal ribs
  - Trunk ribs mostly single headed
- Pectoral region
  - Cleithrum absent (although present in turtles).
- Pelvic region
  - A thyroid fenestra between the pubis and ischium
- Limb region
  - Fifth distal tarsal absent
  - Short and stout fifth or hooked metatarsal

However, some of these characters might be lost or modified in several lineages, particularly among birds and turtles; it is best to see these characters as the ancestral features that were present in the ancestral saurian.

=== Phylogeny ===
The cladogram shown below follows the most likely result found by an analysis of turtle relationships using both fossil and genetic evidence by M.S. Lee, in 2013. This study found Eunotosaurus, sometimes regarded as a turtle relative, to be only very distantly related to turtles in the clade Parareptilia.

- - Diapsida
    - †Araeoscelidia
    - Neodiapsida
      - †Claudiosaurus
      - - †Younginiformes
        - Sauria
          - Lepidosauromorpha
          - Archelosauria
            - Pantestudines
              - †Eosauropterygia
              - - †Placodontia
                - - †Sinosaurosphargis
                  - - †Odontochelys
                    - Testudinata
                      - †Proganochelys
                      - Testudines
            - Archosauromorpha
              - †Choristodera
              - - †Prolacertiformes
                - - - †Rhynchosauria
                    - †Trilophosaurus
                  - Archosauriformes

The cladogram below follows the most likely result found by another analysis of turtle relationships, this one using only fossil evidence, published by Rainer Schoch and Hans-Dieter Sues in 2015. This study found Eunotosaurus to be an actual early stem-turtle, though other versions of the analysis found weak support for it as a parareptile.

- Sauria
  - Ankylopoda
    - - Lepidosauromorpha
        - †Kuehneosauridae
        - Lepidosauria
          - Rhynchocephalia
          - Squamata
      - Pantestudines
        - †Sauropterygia
          - †Eosauropterygia
          - - †Placodontia
            - †Sinosaurosphargis
        - - †Eunotosaurus
          - - †Pappochelys
            - - †Odontochelys
              - Testudinata
                - †Proganochelys
                - Testudines
  - Archosauromorpha

The cladogram below follows the analysis of Li et al. (2018). It places turtles within Diapsida but outside of Sauria (the Lepidosauromorpha + Archosauromorpha clade).

- †Parareptilia
- Eureptilia
  - †Captorhinidae
  - - †Paleothyris
    - Diapsida
      - †Araeoscelidia
      - - †Hovasaurus
        - - †Youngina
          - crown‑group
            - Pantestudines
              - - †Acerosodontosaurus
                - †Claudiosaurus
              - - †Eunotosaurus
                - - †Pappochelys
                  - - †Eorhynchochelys
                    - - †Odontochelys
                      - Testudinata
            - Sauria
              - Lepidosauromorpha
                - - †Kuehneosauridae
                  - - †Saurosphargidae
                    - - †Eosauropterygia
                      - †Placodus
                - Lepidosauria
                  - Rhynchocephalia
                  - Squamata
              - Archosauromorpha
                - - †Rhynchosauria
                  - †Trilophosaurus
                - - †Prolacerta
                  - Archosauriformes

The following cladogram was found by Simões et al. (2022):

- Neoreptilia
  - †Procolophonomorpha
  - Neodiapsida
    - †Younginiformes
    - - †Eunotosaurus
      - - †Weigeltisauridae
        - Sauria
          - Lepidosauromorpha
            - Rhynchocephalia (tuatara and their extinct relatives)
            - Squamata (lizards and snakes)
          - Archelosauria
            - Pantestudines (turtles and extinct relatives)
            - Archosauromorpha
              - - †Ichthyosauromorpha
                - - †Sauropterygia
                  - †Thalattosauria
              - - †Protorosauria
                  - †Protorosaurus
                  - - †Tanystropheidae
                    - - †Drepanosauromorpha
                      - †Kuehneosauridae
                - - - †Allokotosauria
                    - †Rhynchosauria
                  - Archosauriformes (crocodiles, birds, and their extinct relatives)

Cladogram of Jenkins et al. 2026, which found Pantestudines within Archosauromorpha with strong morphological support.

- Neodiapsida
  - †Saurosternon
  - - †Younginidae
    - - †Tangasauridae
      - - †Claudiosaurus
        - - †Weigeltisauridae
          - †Drepanosauromorpha
          - Sauria
            - Lepidosauromorpha
              - †Paliguana
              - - †Sophineta
                - - - †Marmoretta
                    - †Megachirella
                  - Lepidosauria
                    - Squamata
                    - Rhynchocephalia
            - Archosauromorpha
              - †Sauropterygia
              - - †Protorosaurus
                - Archelosauria
                  - Pantestudines
                  - - †Tanystropheidae
                    - - †Prolacerta
                      - - †Allokotosauria
                        - - †Rhynchosauria
                          - - †Teyujagua
                            - Archosauriformes (including Archosauria)
