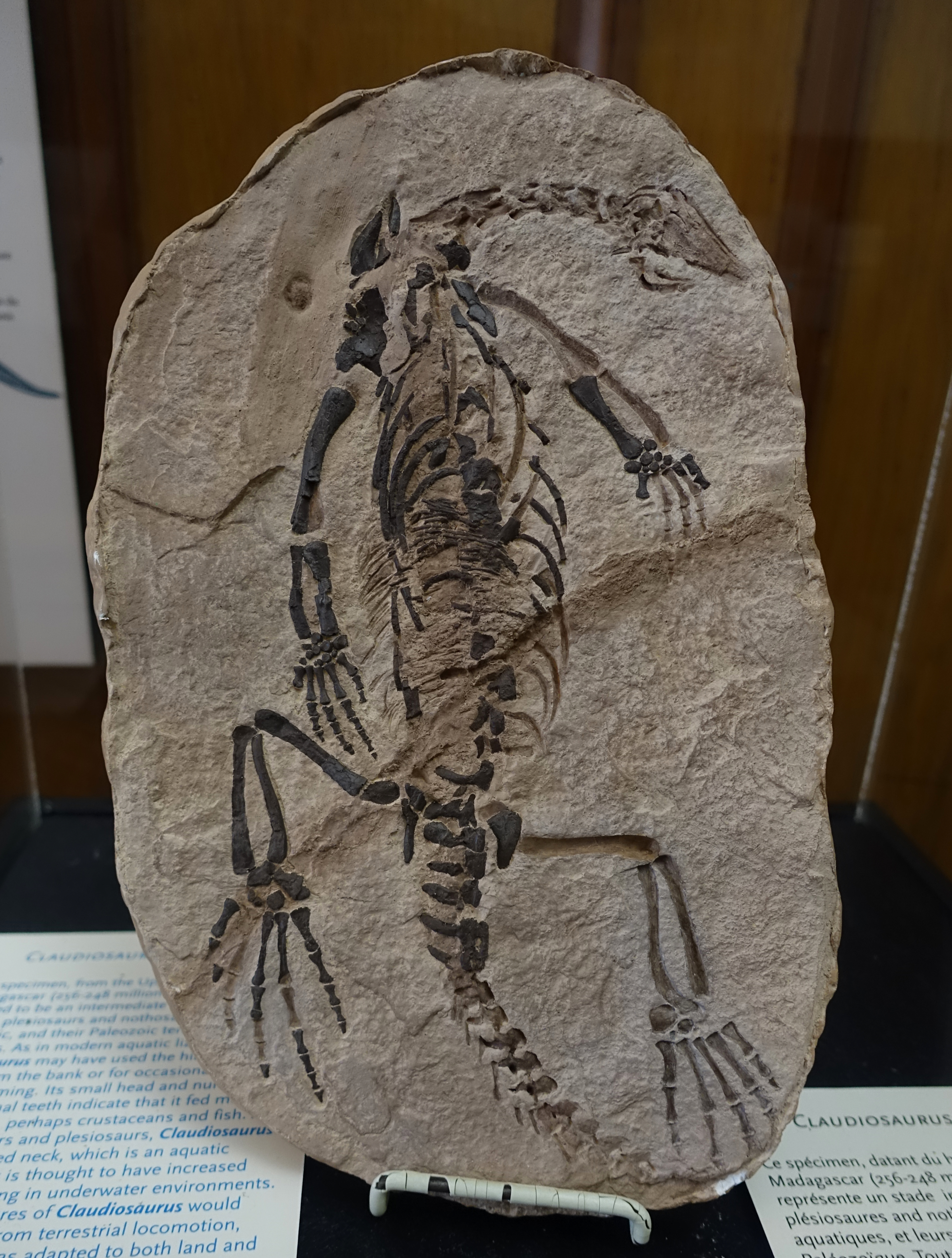
- Specimen of Claudiosaurus germaini, on display at the Redpath Museum, Montreal

Scientific classification
- Kingdom: Animalia
- Phylum: Chordata
- Class: Reptilia
- Clade: Neodiapsida
- Family: †Claudiosauridae; Carroll 1981
- Genus: †Claudiosaurus; Carroll 1981

Type species
- †Claudiosaurus germaini Carroll 1981

= Claudiosaurus =

Claudiosaurus Temporal range: Lopingian ~259–252 Ma

Extinct genus of reptiles

Claudiosaurus (after the discoverer Claude Germain and saurus, 'lizard') is an extinct genus of diapsid reptiles from the Late Permian Lower Sakamena Formation of the Morondava Basin, Madagascar. It has been suggested to be semi-aquatic.

== History and discovery ==
Claudiosaurus is known from the Lower Sakamena Formation of Madagascar where it was discovered near Leoposa. Claudiosaurus is found from the Late Permian. Although a paper mentions that they have been also found in Early Triassic deposits of Madagascar, citation does not mention that Claudiosaurus is from Triassic.

== Description ==
Size compared to human hand

Individuals of Claudiosaurus reached a body length of approximately 60 centimetres (2.0 ft). The body form of Claudiosaurus is generally similar to those of other basal diapsids, although the neck of Claudiosaurus is somewhat elongated, with 8 cervical vertebrae, and had a proportionally small head. The body has 16 trunk vertebrae with gastralia present on the underside, and the tail has at least 45 caudal vertebrae. The jaws had numerous small teeth, with the roof of the mouth (palate) being covered in numerous denticles. The sternum is unossified. The pectoral girdle is similar to those of other primitive diapsids. The phalanges of the hands show a reduction of length away from the base, with the exception of the distalmost phalange of the third digit, which is longer than the preceding phalange. The terminal phalanges are flattened. The bones of Claudiosaurus show pachyostosis, suggested to possibly be an adaptation for aquatic life.

== Ecology ==
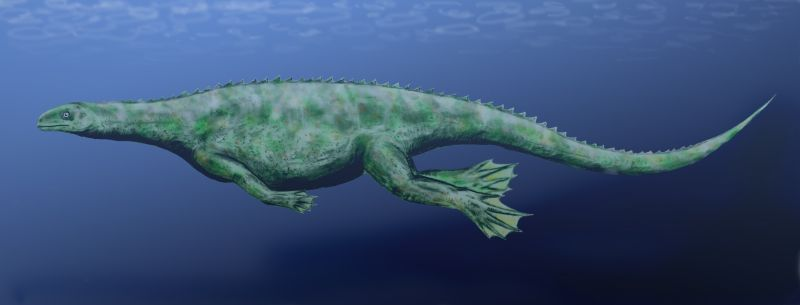
Life restoration of Claudiosaurus germaini

Claudiosaurus is generally assumed to have been an amphibious animal, using its limbs for propulsion, though it was still likely capable of walking on land, and the skeleton shows only limited adaptations to aquatic life. It has been suggested to have fed on small invertebrates, such as crustaceans.

== Classification ==
Upon its original description, Robert L. Carroll suggested that Claudiosaurus belonged to Sauropterygia (which includes plesiosaurs). Other later studies have generally recovered it as a basal neodiapsid, sometimes as a member of the Younginiformes. Claudiosaurus was recovered as a relative of turtles by Li et al. (2018), forming a clade with the basal neodiapsid Acerosodontosaurus. Although another study in 2020 specifically disputed these conclusions.

In their phylogenetic analyses, Jenkins et al 2025 recovered Claudiosaurus as a basal neodiapsid immediately outside of the reptile crown group, diverging after 'younginiforms' (Younginidae + Tangasauridae) and weigeltisaurids:

- Sauropsida
  - †Araeoscelidia
  - - †Bolosauridae
    - Neoreptilia
      - †Ankyramorpha
        - †Acleistorhinidae
        - - †Pareiasauromorpha
          - †Procolophonoidea
      - - †Mesosauridae
        - - - †Cabarzia
            - - †Ascendonanus
              - †Orovenator
          - Parapleurota
            - †Millerettidae
            - Neodiapsida
              - †Younginidae
              - - †Tangasauridae
                - - †Weigeltisauridae
                  - - †Claudiosaurus
                    - Sauria
                      - Lepidosauromorpha
                      - Archosauromorpha

== Paleoenvironment ==
The Lower Sakamena Formation was deposited in a wetland environment situated within a North-South orientated rift valley, perhaps similar to Lake Tanganyika. The climate at the time of deposition was temperate, warm, and humid, with seasonal rainfall and possible monsoons. Flora from the formation includes the equisetalean Schizoneura, the glossopterid gymnosperm Glossopteris, and seed fern Lepidopteris. Other vertebrates known from the Lower Sakamena Formation include the palaeoniscoid fish Atherstonia, the procolophonid parareptile Barasaurus, the gliding weigeltisaurid reptile Coelurosauravus, the neodiapsids Hovasaurus, Thadeosaurus, and Acerosodontosaurus, fragments of rhinesuchid temnospondyls, an indeterminate theriodont therapsid and the dicynodont Oudenodon.
