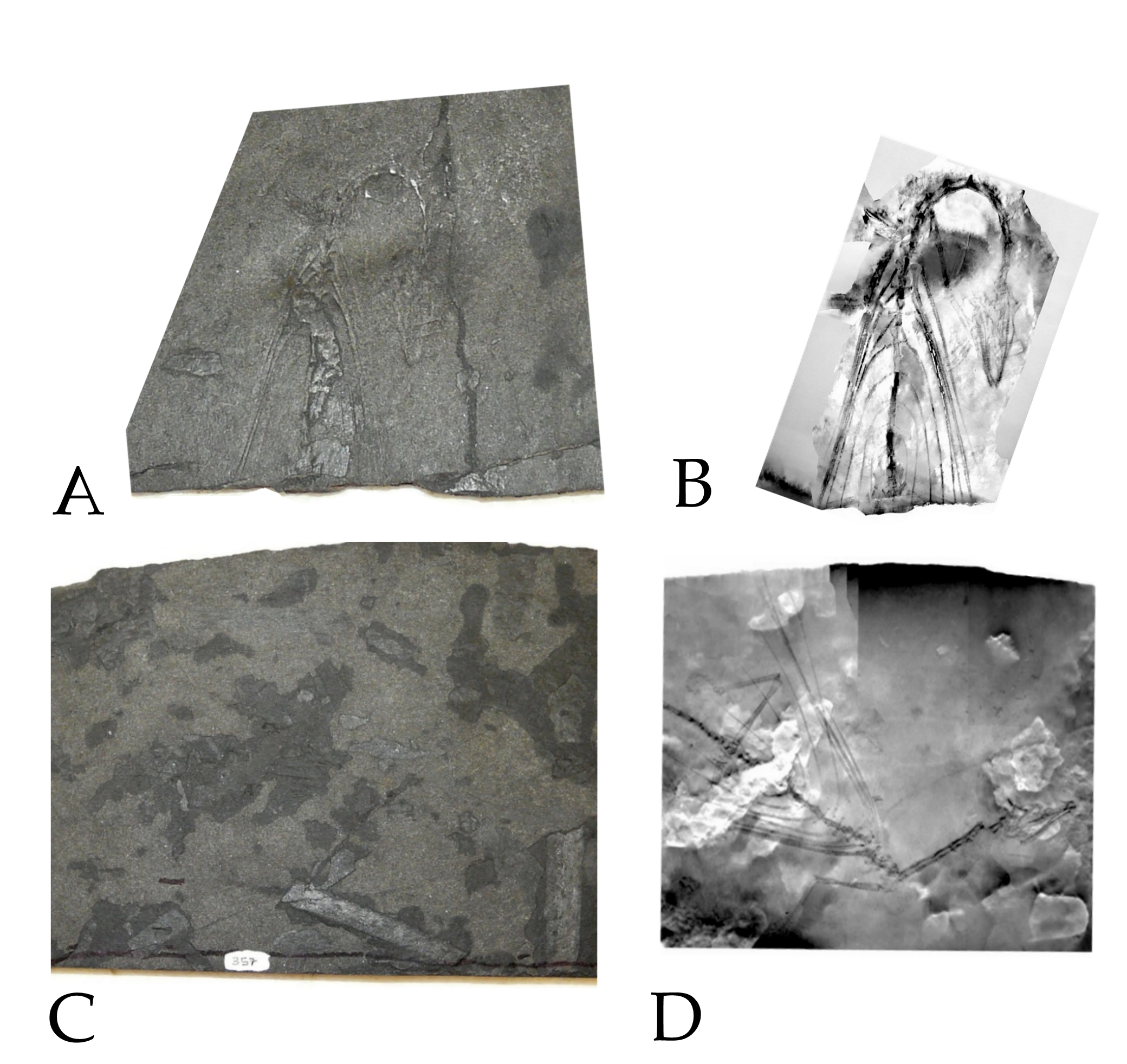
- Slabs and CT scans of Mecistotrachelos specimens VMNH 3649 (A-B) and 3650 (C-D)

Scientific classification
- Kingdom: Animalia
- Phylum: Chordata
- Class: Reptilia
- Clade: Archosauromorpha (?)
- Genus: †Mecistotrachelos; Fraser et al., 2007

Type species
- †Mecistotrachelos apeoros Fraser et al., 2007

= Mecistotrachelos =

Mecistotrachelos Temporal range: Late Triassic, mid-Norian

Extinct genus of reptiles

Mecistotrachelos is an extinct genus of gliding reptile from the Late Triassic of Virginia. It is generally interpreted as an archosauromorph, distantly related to crocodylians and dinosaurs. The type and only known species is M. apeoros. This specific name translates to "soaring longest neck", in reference to its gliding habits and long neck. This superficially lizard-like animal was able to spread its lengthened ribs and glide on wing-like membranes. Mecistotrachelos had a much longer neck than other gliding reptiles of the Triassic such as Icarosaurus and Kuehneosaurus. It was probably an arboreal insectivore.

== Discovery ==
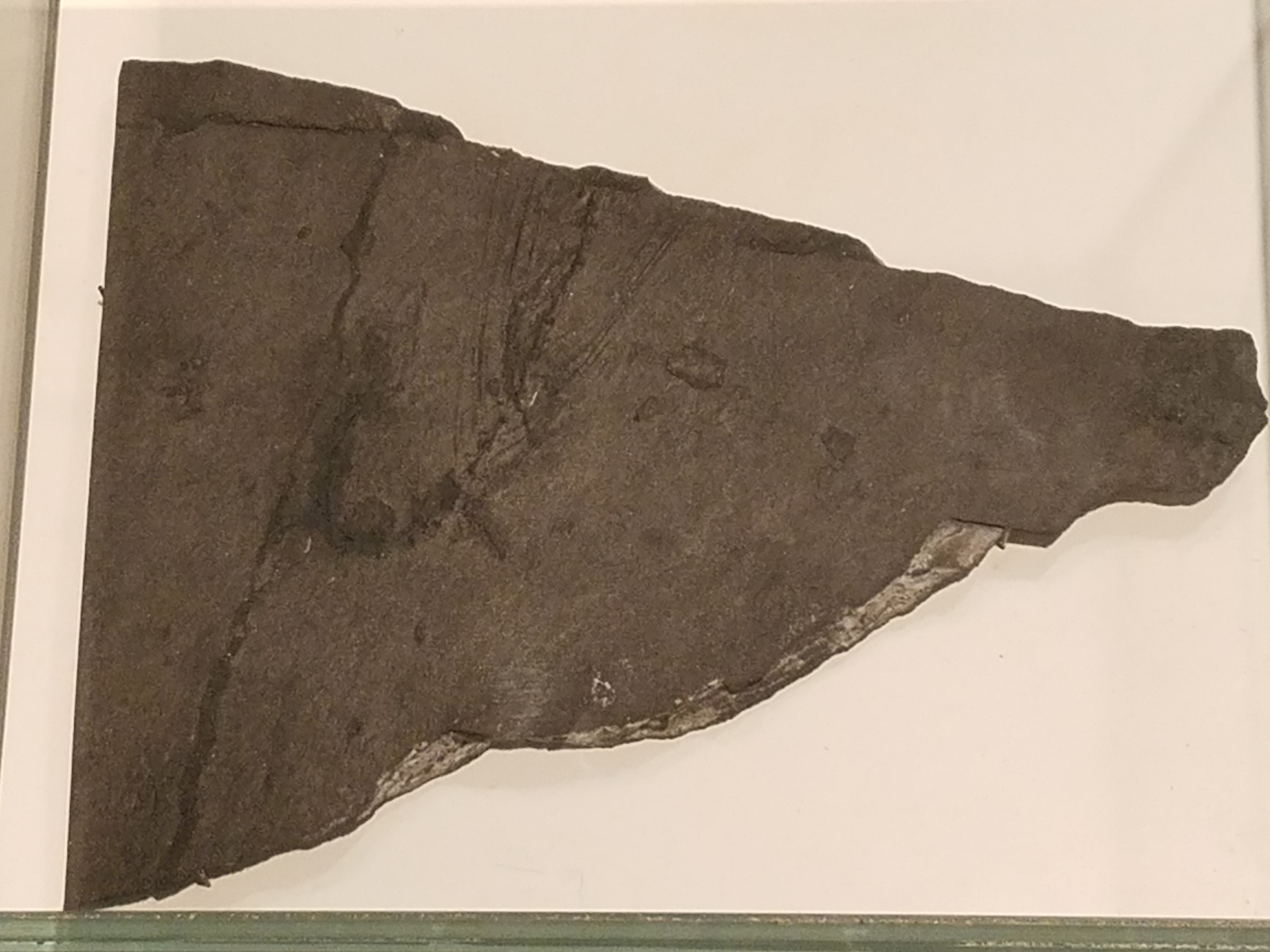
VMNH 3649, the holotype specimen of Mecistotrachelos apeoros

Mecistotrachelos is known from several fossil specimens excavated from the Solite quarry from the Cow Branch Formation on the Virginia-North Carolina border. Only two of these have been formally described in a scientific journal. The first fossil was found in 1994 and the second fossil eight years later by Nick Fraser, a vertebrate paleontologist at the Virginia Museum of Natural History. The first fossil, VMNH 3649, is the holotype of the genus and is preserved completely articulated, although missing the tail, hindlimbs, and most of the pelvic girdle. The second fossil, VMNH 3650, is sometimes considered a paratype and is more complete, only missing part of the tail as well as the left hindlimb.

The Solite quarry was once a large lake and surrounding wetland which formed in a rift basin when Pangaea started to break up during the Late Triassic. The quarry's sediments were initially believed to have formed during the Carnian stage of the Triassic, about 230 million years ago. More recent magnetostratigraphy of the Cow Branch Formation supports a younger age in the middle Norian, closer to 220 million years ago. The ancient lake held abundant populations of insects and the tanystropheid reptile Tanytrachelos. The fossils of the Solite quarry are often preserved as dark grey bones embedded in dark grey mudstone, and are thus usually very difficult to observe and prepare. As a result, the Mecistotrachelos specimens had to be CT scanned to be properly described. This makes Mecistotrachelos one of the first extinct animals to be described based almost entirely on CT scan data.

== Description ==
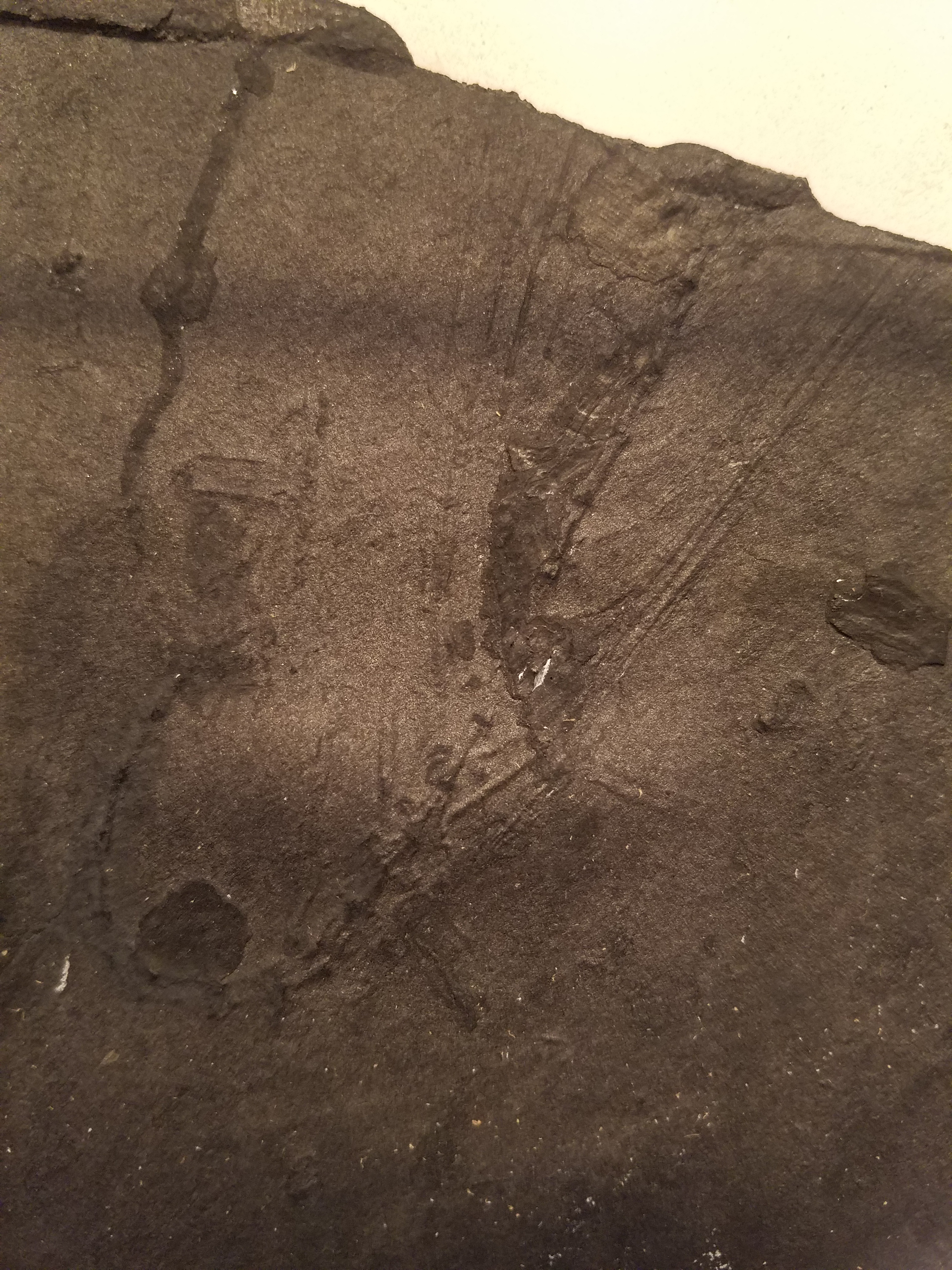
A close view of VMNH 3649

Size of Mecistotrachelos (teal, bottom center) compared to a human hand, a modern gliding lizard (Draco volans), and various unrelated extinct gliding reptiles

The skull is lightly built and pointed, and there is some evidence for holes in the back of the head, indicating that the animal was a diapsid reptile. The neck is long, consisting of 8 or 9 cervical vertebrae. These vertebrae are elongated but seemingly lack visible cervical ribs, although it is possible that they were too thin or close to the vertebrae to be preserved as separate structures. 13 or 14 dorsal (back) vertebrae were present, a condition similar to most diapsids. The first few dorsals were short and almost all of the dorsals had bony prongs (transverse processes) sticking out of their sides. The tail is missing or incomplete in the described specimens. Specific details of the pectoral and pelvic girdles cannot be identified in the CT scans. The limbs are long and slender, with the hind limbs slightly longer than the front limbs. The manus (hand) had five fingers while the pes (foot) had short metatarsals and an indeterminate number of toes which seemed to have hooked inwards, at least in VMNH 3650.

The most unusual and characteristic feature of this genus relates to its ribs. While the first dorsal rib was quite short, at least the next 8 (termed 'thoracolumbar ribs') were very long. They had robust attachment points (particularly the first few) and curved backwards slightly before straightening and tapering. This contrasts with the gliding ribs of kuehneosaurids, which were straight before curving backwards and downwards. The longest ribs were attached to the third and fourth vertebrae, after which they started to decrease in size. At their longest point (~70 centimeters or 28 inches in VMNH 3650) they were a bit less than half the total estimated length of the animal.

== Paleobiology ==
The long ribs of Mecistotrachelos almost certainly were covered with some form of skin which facilitated gliding habits. In addition, the flexible hind limbs with "hooked" toes preserved in VMNH 3650 indicate that it was well-adapted for an arboreal habitat. However, the long and rigid neck would have hampered gliding abilities. The small teeth of Mecistotrachelos would have been suitable for an insectivorous diet.

Unlike in kuehneosaurids, which had downward-curving "wings", the ribs of Mecistotrachelos were mostly straight, and were not naturally cambered to create an airfoil. Nevertheless, if the front ribs could be flexed independently of the others, it is possible that a Mecistotrachelos would have been able to create a variable airfoil. In this case they would function as a pteroid bone in pterosaurs or an alula in birds, increasing or decreasing drag depending on their position. The robust rib heads of these front ribs also support this hypothesis.

Mecistotrachelos was far from the only rib-gliding reptile in prehistory. In the late Permian lived the weigeltisaurids, which had novel rod-like bones rather than ribs. There are also various different gliding lizards, such as Draco (the flying dragon) of the modern day as well as Xianglong from the early Cretaceous. The only other Triassic rib-gliding reptiles were the kuehneosaurids, whose taxonomic position is controversial and also potentially archosauromorphs, though unrelated to Mecistotrachelos.

The skull of VMNH 3649 is comparatively larger than that of VMNH 3650, but the forelimbs are shorter. This may be an example of sexual dimorphism.

== Classification ==
Oddly enough, Mecistotrachelos shares few features with other gliding reptiles, apart from its gliding adaptations and general body shape. Instead, the pointed skull and long neck of this genus is more reminiscent of early archosauromorphs, also known as "protorosaurs". Archosauromorpha is the lineage which would eventually lead to crocodilians and dinosaurs (including birds). Early representatives of the group superficially resembled long-necked lizards, despite true lizards being on a different reptilian lineage. However, few skull details can be observed in the CT scans to clarify this classification.

Mecistotrachelos is not the only putative "protorosaur" with gliding adaptations. Sharovipteryx, a genus from Kazakhstan, preserved skin impressions stretching between its long legs and its tail. This form of gliding contrasts with the rib gliding of Mecistotrachelos, and they are probably not particularly closely related even if they are both archosauromorphs.
