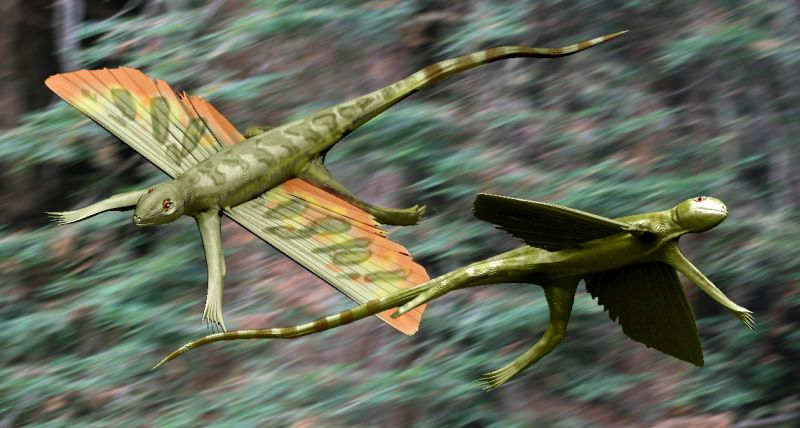
- Life restoration of Kuehneosuchus (left) and Kuehneosaurus (right)

Scientific classification
- Kingdom: Animalia
- Phylum: Chordata
- Class: Reptilia
- Family: †Kuehneosauridae
- Genus: †Kuehneosuchus; Robinson, 1967

Type species
- †Kuehneosaurus latissimus (Robinson, 1962)

Synonyms
- "Plesiodraco" Tarlo, 1962 (nomen nudum)

= Kuehneosuchus =

Kuehneosuchus Temporal range: Late Triassic, Norian

Extinct genus of reptiles

Kuehneosuchus is an extinct genus of kuehneosaurid reptile known from the Late Triassic (Norian age) of southwest England. It was named by Pamela Lamplugh Robinson in 1967 and the type and only species is Kuehneosuchus latissimus. It is known from the holotype NHMUK PV R 6111, a set of associated vertebrae and ribs. It is a derived kuehneosaurid, most closely related to Kuehneosaurus. The genera can be distinguished from one another primarily on the length of their elongate ribs, relatively short and massive in Kuehneosaurus but up to 4 times longer and more gracile in Kuehneosuchus, reaching a wingspan of 40 centimetres (16 in). The skull, size (reaching a head and body length of 25 centimetres (9.8 in)) and major postcranial bones are essentially identical in both Kuehneosuchus and Kuehneosaurus, as their age and horizon. According to aerodynamic studies Kuehneosuchus, unlike Kuehneosaurus which may be a species of the same genus or represent a different sexual morph, was probably an effective glider, similar to the much smaller living gliding lizards.

Size of Kuehneosuchus (brown, center) compared to fellow kuehneosaurids Kuehneosaurus and Icarosaurus, as well as to other unrelated extinct gliding reptiles and Draco volans, a living gliding lizard.
