= Flying and gliding animals =

Animals that have evolved aerial locomotion

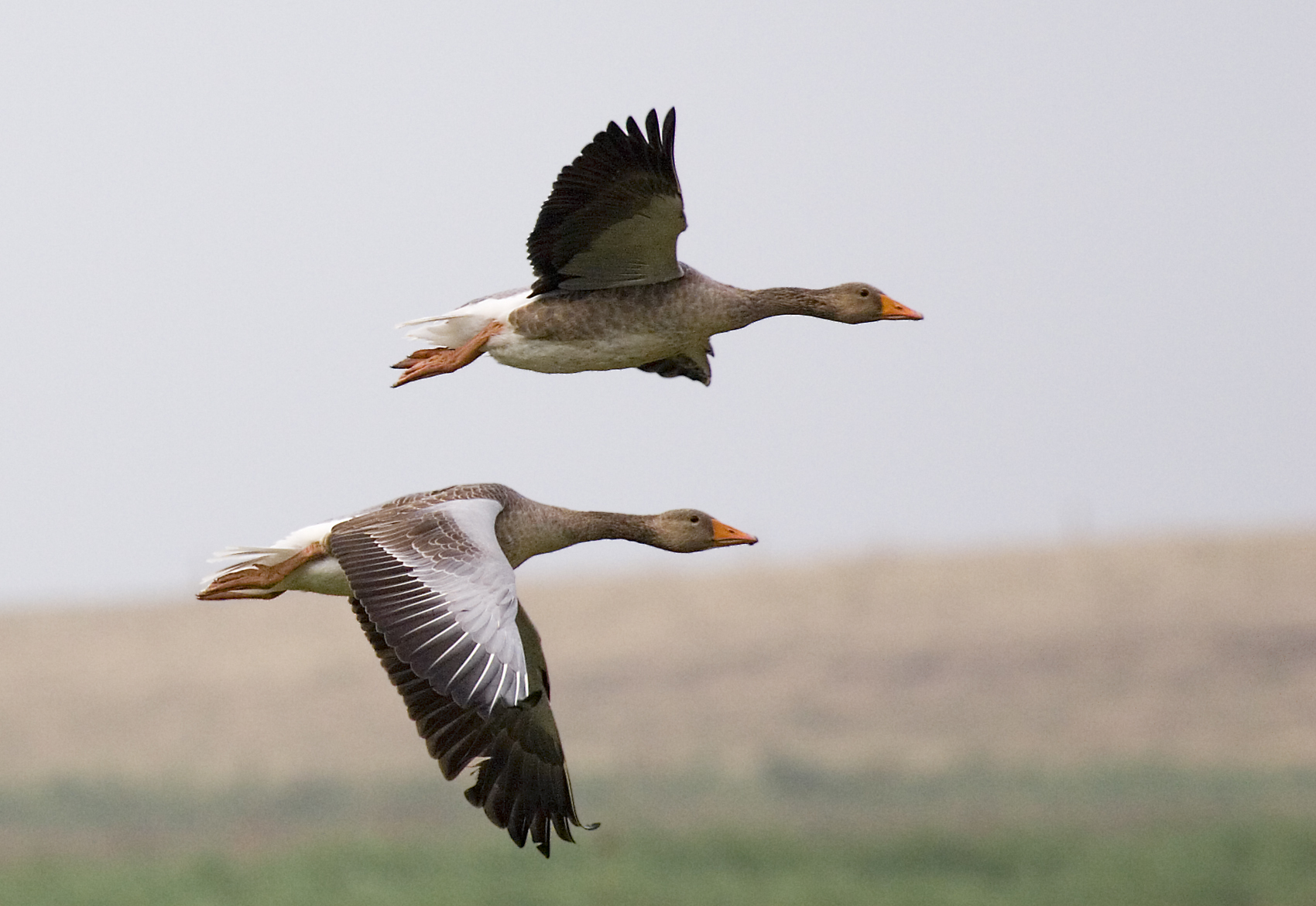
Greylag geese (Anser anser). Birds are one of only four taxonomic groups to have evolved powered flight.

A number of animals are capable of aerial locomotion, either by active flight, passive gliding or, in rare occasions, ballooning, also known as kiting. Such animals typically have appendages that interact with air to generate lift in order to overcome the weight of their own body and any payload they are carrying (e.g. food, prey or nesting materials). The majority of flying and glide animals are terrestrial, although species from one extant taxon, the flying fish, are aquatic.

The ability to fly or glide has appeared via convergent evolution many times throughout the history of life. Wing-powered flight has evolved prominently in at least four terrestrial clades: pterygote insects, pterosaurs, birds and bats. Gliding and kiting, which are essentially controlled, prolonged free falls, have evolved on many more occasions, primarily among arboreal species, especially in the rainforests of Asia and most especially Borneo. This is likely due to the height of the trees, which makes it costly to descend and travel between trees, and the density of groundcover, which favours ambush predators. Several species of amphibians, such as flying frogs, and reptiles, such as flying lizards and flying snakes, have also evolved gliding ability, typically as a means of escape behaviour to evade predators. Ballooning, which resembles paragliding, has developed among several species of silk-spinning arthropods, such as spiders, spider mites and some caterpillars, as a means of airborne dispersal.

== Types ==
Animal aerial locomotion can be divided into two categories: powered and unpowered. In unpowered modes of locomotion, the animal uses aerodynamic forces exerted on the body due to wind or falling through the air. In powered flight, the animal either uses muscular power or natural forces to generate aerodynamic forces to climb or to maintain steady, level flight. Those which can find air that is rising faster than they are falling can gain altitude by soaring.

=== Unpowered flight ===
These modes of locomotion typically require that an animal start from a raised location, converting that potential energy into kinetic energy and using aerodynamic forces to control trajectory and angle of descent. Energy is continually lost to drag without being replaced, thus these methods of locomotion have limited range and duration.

- Falling: decreasing altitude under the force of gravity, using no adaptations to increase drag or provide lift.
- Parachuting: falling at an angle greater than 45° from the horizontal, with adaptations to increase drag forces. Very small animals may be carried up by the wind. Some gliding animals may use their gliding membranes (patagia) for drag rather than lift, to safely descend. Smaller animals tend to rely on parachuting rather than gliding using patagia.
- Gliding: falling at an angle less than 45° from the horizontal, with lift from adapted aerofoil membranes. This allows slowly falling directed horizontal movement, with streamlining to decrease drag forces for aerofoil efficiency and often provides some manoeuvrability in air. Gliding animals have a lower aspect ratio (wing length/breadth) than true flyers.

=== Powered flight ===
Powered flight uses muscles to generate aerodynamic force, which allows the animal to produce lift and thrust. The animal may ascend without the use of rising air. Powered flight has evolved at least four times: first in pterygote insects, then in pterosaurs, next in birds, and last in bats. Studies on theropod dinosaurs suggest at least three independent acquisitions of powered flight, and a 2020 study proposed independent acquisitions amidst the different bat clades as well.

=== Externally powered flight ===
Ballooning and soaring are not powered by muscle, but rather by external aerodynamic sources of energy: wind and rising thermals, respectively. Both can continue as long as the source of external power is present. Soaring is typically only seen in species capable of powered flight, as it requires extremely large wings.

- Ballooning: being carried up into the air from the aerodynamic effect on long strands of silk in the wind. Certain silk-producing arthropods, mostly small or young spiders, secrete a special light-weight gossamer silk for ballooning, sometimes travelling great distances at high altitude.
- Soaring: gliding in rising or otherwise moving air that requires specific physiological and morphological adaptations that can sustain the animal aloft without flapping its wings. The rising air is due to thermals, ridge lift or other meteorological features. Under the right conditions, soaring creates a gain of altitude without expending energy. Large wingspans are needed for efficient soaring.

Many species will use multiple modes at different times; a hawk can use powered flight to rise, then soar on thermals, then descend via free-fall to catch its prey.

== Evolution and ecology ==
=== Gliding and parachuting ===
Gliding may have evolved completely separately from wing-powered flight. Unlike wing-powered flight, gliding has evolved independently more than 30 times; however, these groups have not radiated nearly as much as the groups of flying animals.

Usually, gliding aids animals in leaping directly across extended distances—for example, from one tree canopy to another—without having to descend to the ground which would expose them to risks from ground predators. Gliding is also suitable specifically for predator avoidance, allowing for controlled targeted landings to safer areas. Gliding predators may also search more efficiently for prey.

Gliding has some ecological advantages compared to powered flight: it is simpler and more energy efficient. Although moving through the canopy by running along the branches may be less energetically demanding, the faster transition between trees allows for greater foraging rates in a particular patch. Glide ratios, which can be dependent on size and current behaviour, play an important role in this. Low ratios are not as energy efficient as high ratios, but offer other advantages. For example, low glide ratios lead to higher foraging rates, as smaller foraging patches require less gliding time over shorter distances, and thus greater amounts of food can be acquired in a shorter time period. Since gliding animals tend to eat low energy foods such as leaves and are restricted to gliding because of this, they may rely on lower glide ratios to increase the amount of time foraging for this lower energy food. On the other hand, flying animals eat more high energy foods such as fruits, nectar, and insects. An equilibrium glide, where an animal descends at a constant airspeed and glide angle, becomes harder to obtain as the animal's size increases. Larger animals need to glide from much higher heights and longer distances to make gliding energetically beneficial.

Worldwide, the distribution of gliding animals is uneven. Most inhabit the rainforests of Southeast Asia, although a variety of gliding vertebrates are found in mainland Africa, a family of flying frogs lives in South America and several species of gliding squirrels are found in the forests of northern Asia and North America. On the other hand, despite seemingly suitable rain forest habitats, few gliders are found in India or New Guinea and none in Madagascar. Various factors contribute to these disparities, including tree size and prey availability. In the forests of Southeast Asia, the dominant canopy trees (usually dipterocarps) are taller than the canopy trees of the other forests, averaging 60 metres (200 feet) in the Indo-Malayan forests compared to the average forest height of 30–40 m (98–131 ft) in Africa and America. Forest structure and distance between trees are influential in the development of gliding within varying species, and a higher start provides a competitive advantage of further glides and farther travel. Thus, the abundance of gliding animals may be directly correlated with tree height. The lower abundance of insect and small vertebrate prey for carnivorous animals, such as lizards, in Asian forests may also be a factor.

The primary trait which aids in gliding is the gliding membrane, also known as the patagium. In gliders, this can be divided into five parts: the propatagium, the leading edge which extends from the neck or shoulder to the wrist or first digit of the forelimb; the dactylopatagium, between the digits of the forelimb; the plagiopatagium, which stretches from the last digit of the forelimb to the hind limb; and the cruropatagium, which stretches between the hind limbs but doesn't connect to the tail, or the uropatagium, which does connect to the tail. Different species have different types of patagia. These membranes consist of two tightly bound layers of skin connected by muscles and connective tissue between the fore and hind limbs.

Another key trait is the tail, which helps to control the animal's descent. In Australia, all mammalian gliders possess, to some extent, prehensile tails. Outside of Australia, gliders' tails are not prehensile. Globally, tail shape tends to match body size, with smaller gliding species tending towards feather-like tails and larger species towards fur covered, round, bushy tails.

=== Powered flight ===
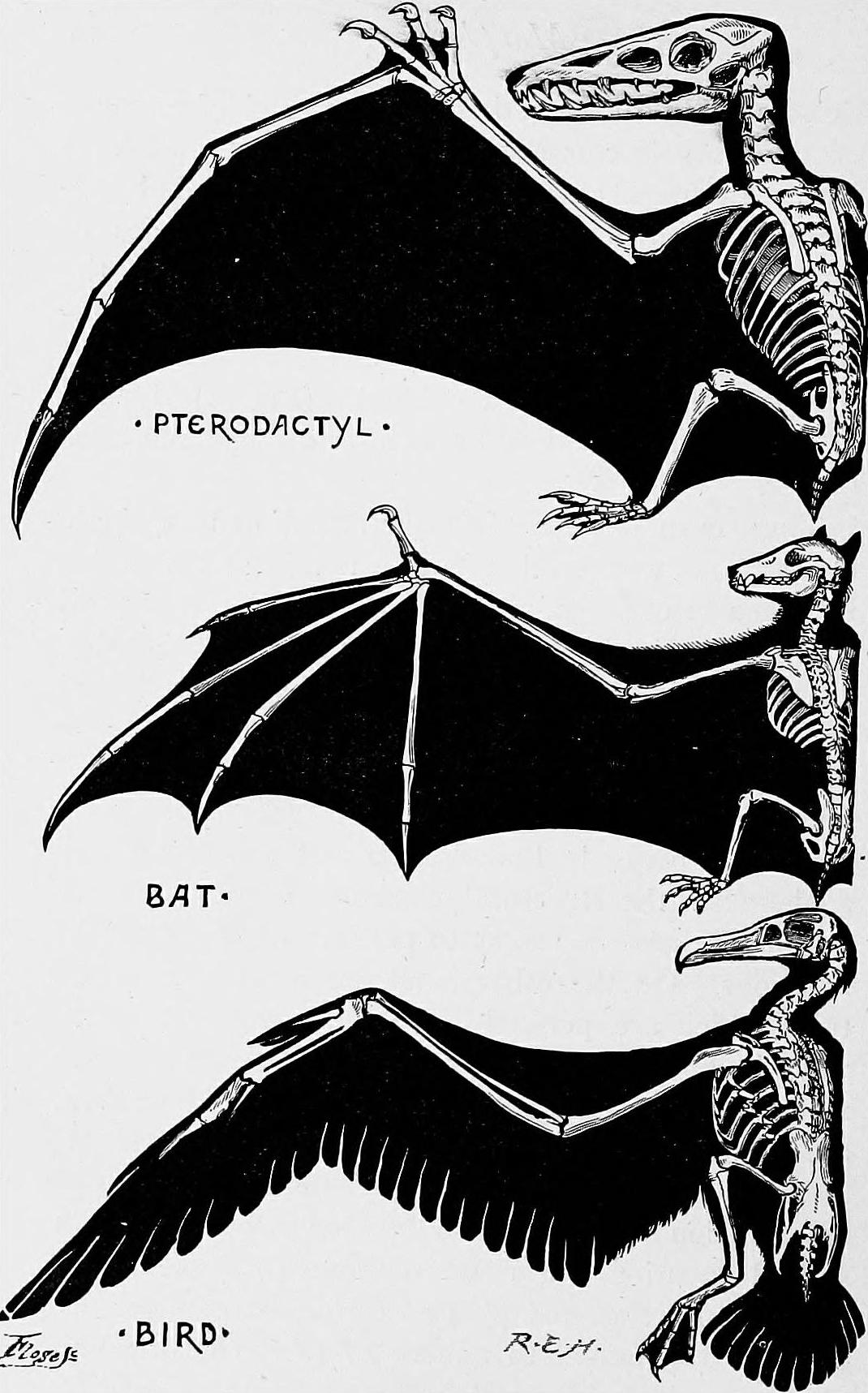
Analogous flying adaptions in vertebrates: 1. pterosaur (Pterosauria); 2. bat (Chiroptera); 3. bird (Aves)

Powered flight has evolved unambiguously only four times—birds, bats, pterosaurs, and pterygotes—though it may have evolved independently within bird and bat groups. In contrast to gliding, which has evolved more frequently but typically gives rise to only a handful of species, all three extant groups of powered flyers have a huge number of species, suggesting that flight is a very successful strategy once evolved. Bats have the second most species of any mammalian order, about 20% of all mammalian species. Birds have the most species of any class of terrestrial vertebrates. Insects, most of which fly at some point in their life cycle, have more species than all other animal groups combined.

The evolution of flight is one of the most striking and demanding in animal evolution, and has attracted the attention of many prominent scientists and generated many theories. One issue is the scarcity of the fossil record: because flying animals tend to be small and have a low mass, both of which increase the surface-area-to-mass ratio, they tend to fossilise infrequently and poorly compared to the larger, heavier-boned, terrestrial species they share habitats with. Fossils of flying animals tend to be confined to exceptional fossil deposits formed under highly specific circumstances, resulting in a particular lack of transitional forms. Furthermore, as fossils do not preserve behaviour or muscle, it can be difficult to discriminate between a poor flier and a good glider.

Insects were the first to evolve flight, approximately 350 million years ago in the group Pterygota. The developmental origin of the insect wing remains in dispute, as does the purpose prior to true flight. One suggestion is that wings initially evolved from tracheal gill structures and were used by small insects that live on the surface of the water to catch the wind. Another is that they evolved, in originally arboreal insects, from paranotal lobes or leg structures and gradually progressed from parachuting to gliding to flight. Most flightless insects today, such as fleas, notopterans, and parasitic lice, had flighted ancestors, in these examples those being, nannochoristid/boreid scorpionflies, reculids, and bark-, book- and cave-lice. The exceptions are silverfish and bristletails, which never evolved flight and are thus older than it, since pterygotes were the first animals to evolve flight.

Pterosaurs were the next to evolve flight, approximately 228 million years ago. These reptiles were close relatives of the dinosaurs, and reached enormous sizes: some of the last forms were the largest flying animals ever to inhabit the Earth, having wingspans of over 10–12 m (33–39 ft). However, they varied in size, all the way down to a 9 cm (3.5 in) wingspan in the anurognathids, and, possibly, a 2.5 cm (0.98 in) wingspan in Nemicolopterus.

Birds have both an extensive fossil record and many forms documenting their evolution from small theropod dinosaurs, as well as the numerous bird-like forms of theropod which did not survive the mass extinction at the end of the Cretaceous. Archaeopteryx is arguably the most famous transitional fossil in the world, both due to its mix of reptilian and avian anatomy and the luck of being discovered only two years after Darwin's publication of On the Origin of Species. However, the ecology of this transition is considerably more contentious, with various scientists supporting either a "trees down" origin, in which an arboreal ancestor evolved gliding and then flight, or a "ground up" origin, in which a fast-running terrestrial ancestor used wings for a speed boost and to help catch prey. It may also have been a non-linear process, as several non-avian dinosaurs seem to have independently acquired powered flight.

Bats are the most recent to evolve (about 60 million years ago), most likely from a fluttering ancestor, though their poor fossil record has hindered more detailed study.

Only a few animals are known to have specialised in soaring: the larger of the extinct pterosaurs, and some large birds. Powered flight is very energetically expensive for large animals, but their size is an advantage when soaring, as it allows them a low wing loading—a large wing area relative to weight—which maximises lift.

== Biomechanics ==
=== Gliding and parachuting ===
During a free-fall with no aerodynamic forces, the object accelerates due to gravity, resulting in increasing velocity as the object descends. During parachuting, animals use the aerodynamic forces on their body to counteract the force of gravity. Any object moving through air experiences a drag force that is proportional to surface area and velocity squared; this force will partially counter the force of gravity, slowing the animal's descent to a safer speed. If this drag is orientated at an angle to the vertical, the animal's trajectory will gradually become more horizontal, and it will cover horizontal as well as vertical distance. Smaller adjustments can allow turning or other manoeuvres. This can allow a parachuting animal to move from a high location on one tree to a lower location on another tree nearby. Specifically in gliding mammals, there are three types of gliding paths: the S glide, where animals gain altitude post-launch then descend, the J glide, where they rapidly decrease height before gliding, and "straight-shaped" glides where they maintain a constant angled descent.

During gliding, lift plays an increased role. Like drag, lift is proportional to velocity squared. Gliding animals will typically leap or drop from high locations such as trees, just as in parachuting and, as gravitational acceleration increases their speed, the aerodynamic forces also increase. Because the animal can utilise lift and drag to generate greater aerodynamic force, it can glide at a shallower angle than parachuting animals, allowing it to cover greater horizontal distance in the same loss of altitude, and reach trees further away. Successful flights for gliding animals are achieved through 5 steps: preparation, launch, glide, braking, and landing. Gliding species are better able to control themselves mid-air, with the tail acting as a rudder, making it capable to pull off banking movements or U-turns during flight. During landing, arboreal mammals will extend their fore and hind limbs in front of themselves to brace for landing and to trap air in order to maximise air resistance and lower impact speed.

=== Powered flight ===
Large milkweed bug flying, repeated at one fifteenth speed.

Unlike most air vehicles, in which the objects that generate lift (wings) and thrust (engine or propeller) are separate and the wings remain fixed, flying animals use their wings to generate both lift and thrust by moving them relative to the body. This has made the flight of organisms considerably harder to understand than that of vehicles, as it involves varying speeds, angles, orientations, areas, and flow patterns over the wings.

A bird or bat flying through the air at a constant speed usually moves its wings in an ellipsoidal motion, mostly up-down but with some fore-aft movement as well. Because the animal is in motion, there is some airflow relative to its body which, combined with the velocity of its wings, generates a faster airflow moving over the wing. This will generate a lift force vector which points forwards and upwards, and a drag force vector which points rearwards and upwards. The upwards components of these counteract gravity, keeping the body in the air, while the forward component provides thrust to counteract both the drag from the wing and from the body as a whole. Pterosaur flight likely worked in a similar manner, though no living pterosaurs remain for study.

Insect flight is considerably different, due to their small size, rigid wings, and other anatomical differences. Turbulence and vortices play a much larger role in insect flight, making it even more complex and difficult to study than the flight of vertebrates. There are two basic aerodynamic models of insect flight. Most insects use a method that creates a spiralling leading edge vortex. Some very small insects use the fling-and-clap, or Weis-Fogh, mechanism, in which the wings clap together above the insect's body and then fling apart. As they fling open, the air gets sucked in and creates a vortex over each wing. This bound vortex then moves across the wing and, in the clap, acts as the starting vortex for the other wing. Circulation and lift are increased, at the price of wear and tear on the wings.

== Limits and extremes ==
=== Flying and soaring ===
==== Largest ====
- The largest known flying animal was formerly thought to be Pteranodon, a pterosaur with a wingspan of up to 7.5 metres (25 ft). However, the more recently discovered azhdarchid pterosaur Quetzalcoatlus is much larger, with estimates of the wingspan ranging from 9 to 12 metres (30 to 39 ft). Some other recently discovered azhdarchid pterosaur species, such as Hatzegopteryx, may have wingspans of a similar size or even slightly larger. Although it is widely thought that Quetzalcoatlus reached the size limit of a flying animal, the same was once said of Pteranodon. The heaviest living flying animals are the kori bustard and the great bustard, with males reaching 21 kilograms (46 lb). The wandering albatross has the greatest wingspan of any living flying animal at 3.63 metres (11.9 ft). Among living animals which fly over land, the Andean condor and the marabou stork have the largest wingspan at 3.2 metres (10 ft). Studies have shown that it is physically possible for flying animals to reach 18-metre (59 ft) wingspans, but there is no firm evidence that any flying animal, not even the azhdarchid pterosaurs, got that large.

Comparison of Quetzalcoatlus northropi with a Cessna 172 light aircraft

==== Smallest ====
- There is no minimum size for getting airborne. Indeed, there are many bacteria floating in the atmosphere that constitute part of the aeroplankton. However, to move about under one's own power and not be overly affected by the wind requires a certain amount of size. The smallest flying vertebrates are the bee hummingbird and the bumblebee bat, both of which may weigh less than 2 grams (0.071 oz). They are thought to represent the lower size limit for endotherm flight. The smallest flying invertebrate is a fairyfly wasp species, Kikiki huna, at 0.15 mm (0.0059 in) (150 μm).

==== Fastest ====
- The fastest of all known flying animals is the peregrine falcon, which, when diving, travels at 300 kilometres per hour (190 mph) or faster. The fastest animal in flapping horizontal flight may be the Mexican free-tailed bat, said to attain about 160 kilometres per hour (99 mph) based on ground speed by an aircraft tracking device. However, this measurement does not separate any contribution from wind speed, so this speed could be partially attributed to strong tailwinds.

==== Slowest ====
- Most flying animals need to travel forward to stay aloft. However, some creatures can stay in the same spot, known as hovering, either by rapidly flapping the wings, such as hummingbirds, hoverflies and dragonflies, or carefully using thermals, such as some birds of prey. The slowest flying non-hovering bird recorded is the American woodcock, at 8 kilometres per hour (5.0 mph).

==== Highest flying ====
- There are records of a Rüppell's vulture (Gyps rueppelli), a large vulture, being sucked into a jet engine 11,550 metres (37,890 ft) above Ivory Coast in West Africa. The animal that regularly flies the highest is the bar-headed goose (Anser indicus), which migrates directly over the Himalayas between its nesting grounds in Tibet and its winter quarters in India. They are sometimes seen flying well above the peak of Mount Everest at 8,848 metres (29,029 ft).

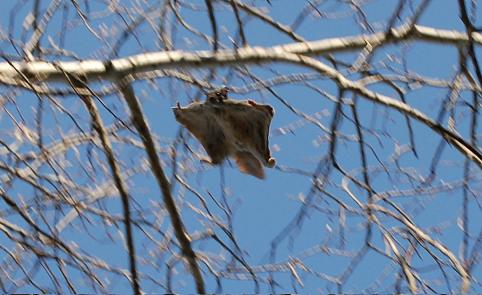
Airborne flying squirrel

=== Gliding and parachuting ===
==== Most efficient glider ====
- This can be defined as the animal that moves most horizontal distance per metre fallen. Flying squirrels are known to glide long distances —one study measured a maximum distance of 160 metres (520 ft)—but have a relatively small glide ratio; the same study measured a mean of 3.1. On the other hand, albatrosses have measured lift–drag ratios of 20, and thus fall just 1 meter for every 20 in still air. Flying fish, meanwhile, have been observed to glide for hundreds of metres on the drafts on the edge of waves with only their initial leap from the water to provide height, but may be obtaining additional lift from wave motion.

==== Most manoeuvrable glider ====
- Many gliding animals have some ability to turn, and thus which one is the most manoeuvrable is difficult to assess. Paradise tree snakes, Chinese gliding frogs, and gliding ants have been observed as having considerable capacity to turn in the air.

== Flying animals ==
=== Extant ===
==== Insects ====
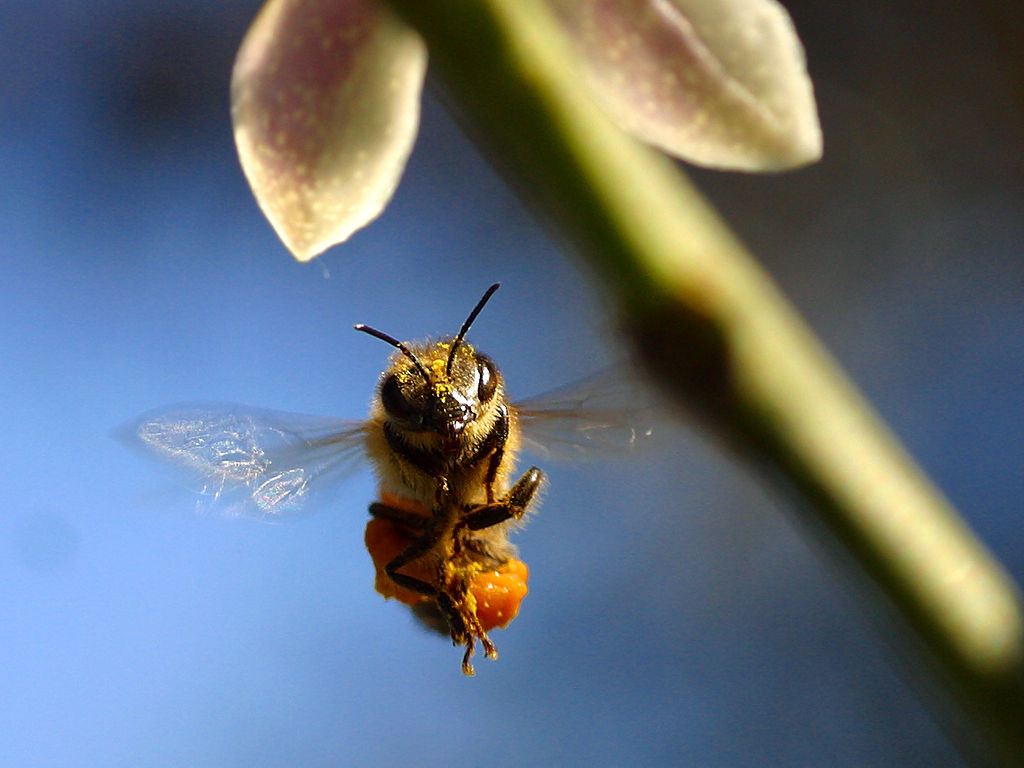
A bee in flight

- Pterygota: the first of all animals to evolve flight, they are also the only arthropods that have evolved flight. As they comprise almost all insects, the species are too numerous to list here. Insect flight is an active research field.

==== Birds ====
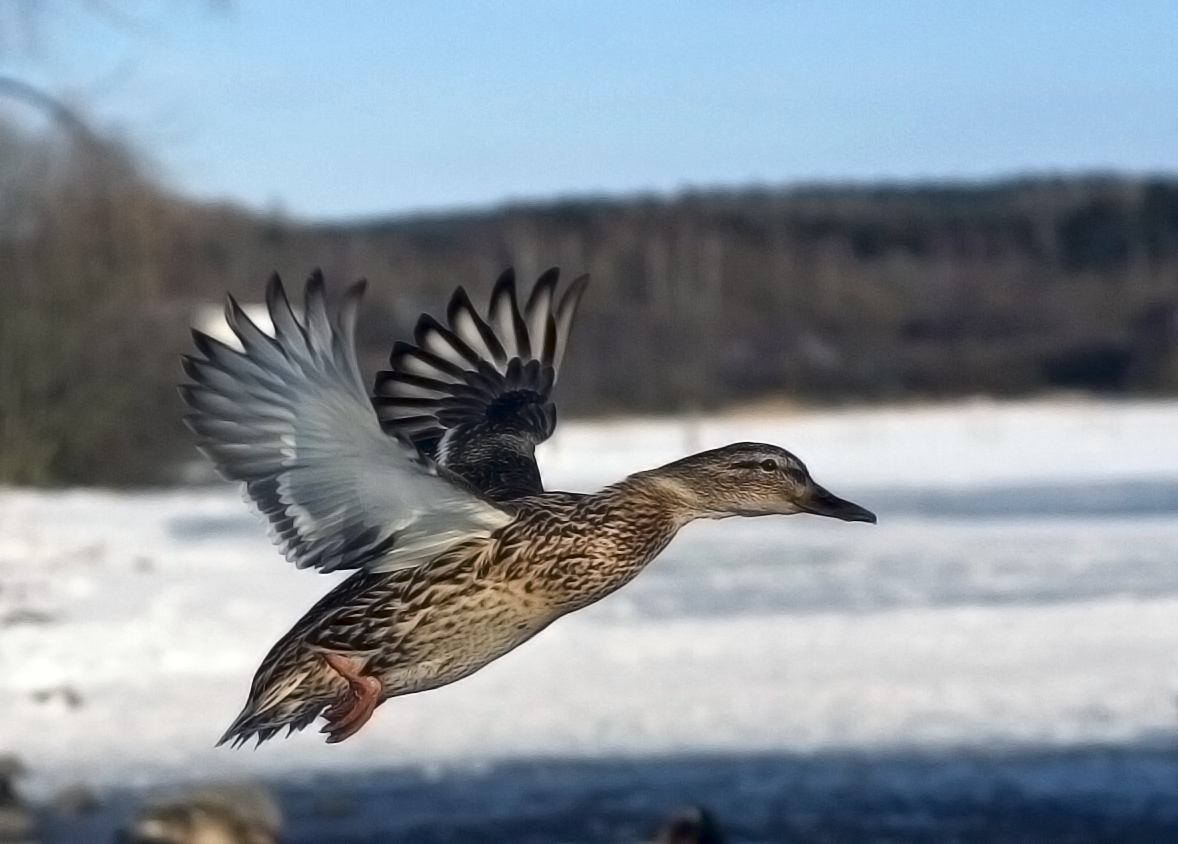
Birds are a successful group of flying vertebrate.

- Birds (flying, soaring): most of the approximately 10,000 living species can fly, the exception being flightless birds. Bird flight is one of the most studied forms of aerial locomotion in animals. See List of soaring birds for birds that can soar as well as fly.

==== Mammals ====
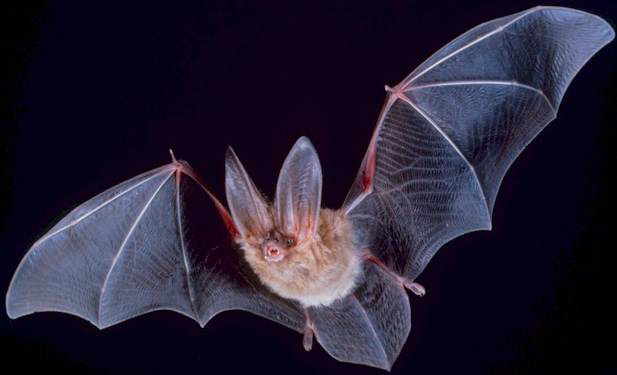
Townsends's big-eared bat, (Corynorhinus townsendii) displaying the "hand wing".

- Bats: there are approximately 1,240 bat species, representing about 20% of all classified mammal species. Most bats are nocturnal and many feed on insects while flying at night, using echolocation to home in on their prey.

=== Extinct ===
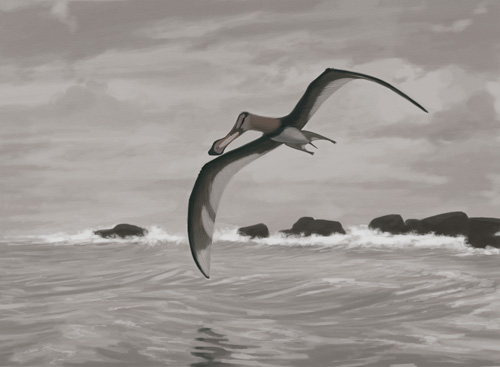
Pterosaurs included the largest known flying animals

==== Pterosaurs ====
- Pterosaurs: the first flying vertebrates, generally agreed to have been sophisticated flyers. They had large wings formed by a patagium stretching from the torso to a dramatically lengthened fourth finger. There were hundreds of species, most of which are thought to have been able to fly, either by intermittent flapping, soaring, or both. The largest known flying animals are pterosaurs.

==== Non-avian dinosaurs ====
- Theropods (gliding and flying): several species of theropod dinosaur outside of birds are thought to have been capable of gliding or flying to some degree. They are not classified as birds, though they are closely related. Some species, such as Microraptor gui, Microraptor zhaoianus, and Changyuraptor, have been found to be fully feathered on all four limbs, giving them four "wings" that they are believed to have used for gliding or flying. A 2019 study indicates that flight may have been acquired independently in various different lineages, though it may have only evolved in theropods in the clade Avialae.

== Gliding animals ==
=== Extant ===
==== Insects ====
- Gliding bristletails: directed aerial gliding descent is found in some tropical arboreal bristletails, an ancestrally wingless sister taxa to the winged insects. The bristletails' median caudal filament is important for the glide ratio and gliding control.
- Gliding ants: the flightless workers of these insects have secondarily gained some capacity to move through the air. Gliding has evolved independently in a number of arboreal ant species from the groups cephalotini and pseudomyrmecinae, as well as the genus Camponotus. No arboreal dolichoderines and non-cephalotine myrmicines, except Daceton armigerum, can glide. Living in the rainforest canopy, like many other gliders, gliding ants use their gliding to return to the trunk of the tree they live on should they fall or be knocked off a branch. Gliding was first discovered in Cephalotes atratus in the Peruvian rainforest. Cephalotes atratus can make 180 degree turns, and locate the trunk using visual cues, succeeding in landing 80% of the time. Unique among gliding animals, Attini and Pseudomyrmecinae ants glide abdomen first; Formicinae, however, glide in the more conventional head first manner.
- Gliding immature insects: wingless immature stages of some insect species that have wings as adults may also show a capacity to glide. These include some species of cockroach, mantis, katydid, stick insect and true bug.

==== Spiders ====
- Ballooning spiders (parachuting): the young of some species of spiders travel through the air by using silk draglines to catch the wind, as may some smaller species of adult spider, such as the money spider family. This behaviour is commonly known as "ballooning". Ballooning spiders make up part of the aeroplankton.

Three views of a selenopid spider gliding in a vertical wind tunnel.

- Gliding selenopid spiders: directed aerial descent, analogous to that observed in bristletails and ants, has also been observed in arboreal selenopid spiders in Panama and Peru. Kinematic measurements obtained using a vertical wind tunnel indicated that steering is controlled via the forelegs, while the six remaining legs are held in a fixed posture.

==== Molluscs ====
- Flying squid: several oceanic squids of the family Ommastrephidae, such as the Pacific flying squid, will leap out of the water to escape predators, an adaptation similar to that of flying fish. Smaller squids will fly in shoals, and have been observed to cover distances as long as 33 metres (108 ft). Small fins towards the back of the mantle do not produce much lift, but do help stabilise the motion of flight. They exit the water by expelling water out of their funnel, and some squid have been observed to continue jetting water while airborne, providing thrust even after leaving the water. This may make flying squid the only animals with jet-propelled aerial locomotion. The neon flying squid has been observed to glide for distances over 30 metres (100 ft), at speeds of up to 11.2 metres per second (37 ft/s; 40 km/h).

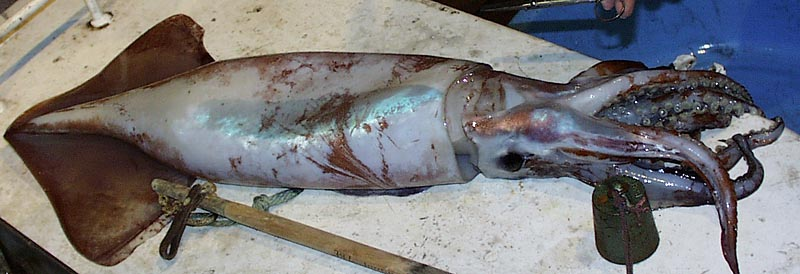
Neon flying squid

==== Fish ====
- Flying fish: there are over 50 species of flying fish, belonging to the family Exocoetidae, mostly marine fishes of small to medium size. The largest flying fish can reach lengths of 45 centimetres (18 in) but most species measure less than 30 cm (12 in) in length. They can be divided into two-winged varieties and four-winged varieties. Before the fish leaves the water, it increases its speed to around 30 body lengths per second and, as it breaks the surface and is freed from the drag of the water, it can be travelling at around 60 kilometres per hour (37 mph). The glides are usually up to 30–50 metres (100–160 ft) in length, but some have been observed soaring for hundreds of metres using the updraft on the leading edges of waves. The fish can also make a series of glides, each time dipping the tail into the water to produce forward thrust. The longest recorded series of glides, with the fish only periodically dipping its tail in the water, was for 45 seconds. It has been suggested that the genus Exocoetus is on an evolutionary borderline between flight and gliding, as it flaps its large pectoral fins while gliding, but does not use a power stroke like flying animals. It has been found that some flying fish can glide as effectively as some flying birds.

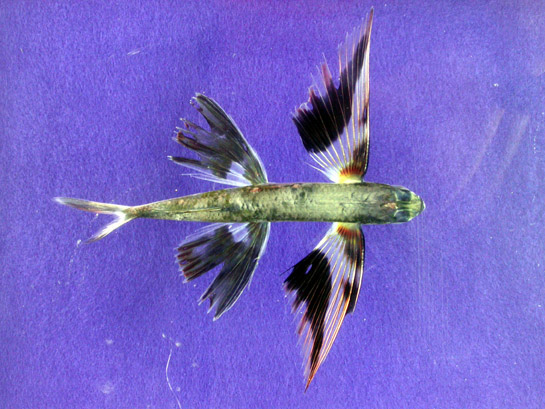
Band-winged flying fish, with enlarged pectoral fins

- Livebearers
  - Halfbeaks: a group related to the Exocoetidae, there are a few hemiramphid species which possess enlarged pectoral fins and show true gliding flight rather than simple leaps. Marshall reports that Euleptorhamphus viridis can cover 50 metres (160 ft) in two separate hops.
  - Trinidadian guppies: these have been observed exhibiting a gliding response to escape predators.
- Freshwater butterflyfish (possibly gliding): Pantodon buchholzi has the ability to jump and possibly glide a short distance. It can move through the air several times the length of its body. While it does this, the fish flaps its large pectoral fins, giving it its common name. However, it is debated whether the freshwater butterfly fish can truly glide or whether it is instead an accomplished jumper.
- Freshwater hatchetfish: in the wild, they have been observed jumping out of the water and gliding and reports of them achieving powered flight have been brought up many times.

==== Amphibians ====
Gliding has evolved independently in two families of tree frogs, the Old World Rhacophoridae and the New World Hylidae. Within each lineage, there are a range of gliding abilities, from non-gliding, to parachuting, to full gliding.

- Rhacophoridae flying frogs: a number of Rhacophoridae, such as Wallace's flying frog (Rhacophorus nigropalmatus), have adaptations for gliding, the main feature being enlarged toe membranes. For example, the Malayan flying frog (Rhacophorus prominanus) glides using the membranes between the toes of its limbs, and small membranes located at the heel, the base of the leg, and the forearm. Some frogs are quite accomplished gliders; for example, the Chinese flying frog (Rhacophorus dennysi) can manoeuvre in the air, making two kinds of turn, either rolling into the turn (a banked turn) or yawing into the turn (a crabbed turn).

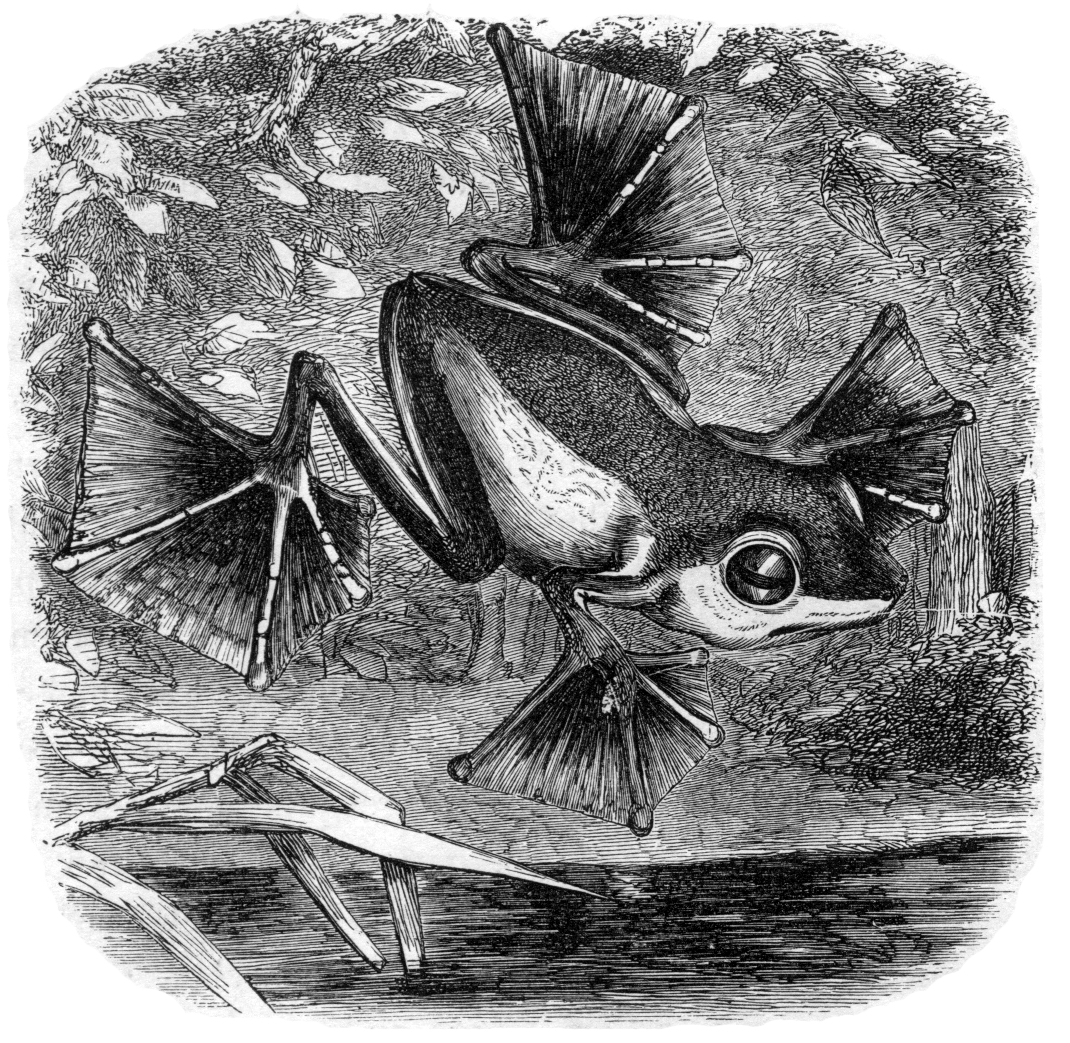
Illustration of Wallace's flying frog in Alfred Russel Wallace's 1869 book The Malay Archipelago

- Hylidae flying frogs: the other frog family that contains gliders, they can be found in the genera Agalychnis and Ecnomiohyla. Similarly to Rhacophoridae, they have interdigital webbing amongst other adaptations for gliding.

==== Reptiles ====
Several lizards and snakes are capable of gliding:

Gliding Draco lizard

- Draco lizards: there are approximately 45 species of lizard of the genus Draco, found in Sri Lanka, India, and Southeast Asia. They live in trees, feeding on tree ants, but nest on the forest floor. They can glide for up to 60 metres (200 ft) and, over this distance, they lose only 10 metres (30 ft) in height. Unusually, their patagium is supported on elongated ribs rather than being attached to their limbs, as is more common among gliding vertebrates. When extended, the ribs form a semicircle on either side the lizard's body and can be folded to the body like a folding fan.
- Gliding lacertids: there are two species of gliding lacertids, of the genus Holaspis, found in Africa. They have fringed toes and tail sides and can flatten their bodies for gliding or parachuting.

The underside of Kuhl's flying gecko (Ptychozoon kuhli). Note the gliding adaptations: flaps of skin on the legs, feet, sides of the body, and on the sides of the head.

- Ptychozoon flying geckos: there are thirteen species of gliding gecko in the genus Ptychozoon, now classified within Gekkonidae, which are found in Southeast Asia. These lizards have small flaps of skin along their limbs, torso, tail, and head that catch the air and enable them to glide.
- Luperosaurus flying geckos: a possible sister-taxon to Ptychozoon, which has similar flaps and folds and also glides.
- Thecadactylus flying geckos: some species of Thecadactylus, such as T. rapicauda, are known to glide.
- Hemidactylus flying gecko: similar adaptations to Ptychozoon are found in the two species of the gecko genus Hemidactylus.
- Chrysopelea snakes: five species of snake from Southeast Asia, Melanesia, and India are able to glide. The paradise tree snake of southern Thailand, Malaysia, Borneo, Philippines, and Sulawesi is the most capable glider of those snakes studied. It glides by stretching out its body sideways and opening its ribs so the belly is concave, while making lateral slithering movements. It can glide up to 100 metres (330 ft) and make 90 degree turns.

==== Mammals ====
Bats are the only freely flying mammals. A few other mammals can glide or parachute: the best known are flying squirrels and flying lemurs.

- Flying squirrels (Pteromyini): there are more than 50 living species divided between 16 genera of flying squirrel. Flying squirrels are found in Asia (most species), North America (New World flying squirrel) and Europe (Siberian flying squirrel). They inhabit tropical, temperate, and subarctic environments, with Glaucomys preferring boreal and montane coniferous forests, specifically choosing red spruce (Picea rubens) trees as landing sites. They are known to rapidly climb trees, but take some time to locate a good landing spot. They tend to be nocturnal and are highly sensitive to light and noise. When a flying squirrel wishes to cross to a tree that is further away than the distance possible by jumping, it extends the cartilage spur on its elbow or wrist. This opens out the flap of furry skin that stretches from its wrist to its ankle. It glides spread-eagle and with its tail fluffed out like a parachute, and grips the tree with its claws when it lands. Flying squirrels have been reported to glide over 200 metres (660 ft), although shorter glides seems to be preferred.
- Anomalures or scaly-tailed flying squirrels: these brightly coloured African rodents are not true squirrels, but have evolved to resemble flying squirrels by convergent evolution. There are six species, divided into two genera - Zenkerella, which has historically been considered an anomalure, is now organised into its own family. All species have gliding membranes between their front and hind legs. The genus Idiurus contains two particularly small species which are known as "flying mice" despite not being mice.
- Colugos or "flying lemurs": there are two species of colugo. Despite their common name, colugos are not lemurs; true lemurs are primates, while colugos are Dermoptera. Molecular evidence suggests that colugos are a sister group to primates; however, some mammalogists suggest they are a sister group to bats. Found in Southeast Asia, the colugo is probably the mammal most adapted for gliding, with a patagium that is as large as geometrically possible and is the most developed of all gliding mammals. They can glide as far as 70 metres (230 ft) with minimal loss of height and have with a mean launch velocity of approximately 3.7 m/s. The Mayan colugo has been known to initiate glides without jumping.
- Sifaka (possible limited gliding or parachuting): a type of lemur, it has thick hairs on its forearms that have been argued to provide drag, and a small membrane under its arms that has been suggested to provide lift by having aerofoil properties. Some other primates, such as indris, galagos and saki monkeys, may have the same adaptations.
- Flying phalangers or wrist-winged gliders: possums found in Australia and New Guinea, their gliding membranes are hardly noticeable until they jump. On jumping, the animal extends all four legs and stretches the loose folds of skin. The subfamily contains eight species. Of these, Krefft's glider and the Biak glider are the most common species.
- Greater gliders: there are three species of the genus Petauroides, of the subfamily Hemibelideinae. These marsupials are found in Australia, and were originally classed with the flying phalangers, but are now recognised as separate. Its flying membrane only extends to the elbow, rather than to the wrist. It has elongated limbs compared to its non-gliding relatives.
- Ring-tailed glider (Tous ayamaruensis): a species of gliding possum, of the subfamily Hemibelideinae, which has a unique combination of a strongly prehensile tail and a well-developed patagium. It is further distinguished from its closest relatives by its very small size, naked ears, ear rings, and non-bushy tapering tail.
- Feathertail glider (Acrobates pygmaeus): a possum found in Australia. It is the size of a very small mouse and the smallest mammalian glider.

=== Extinct ===
==== Reptiles ====
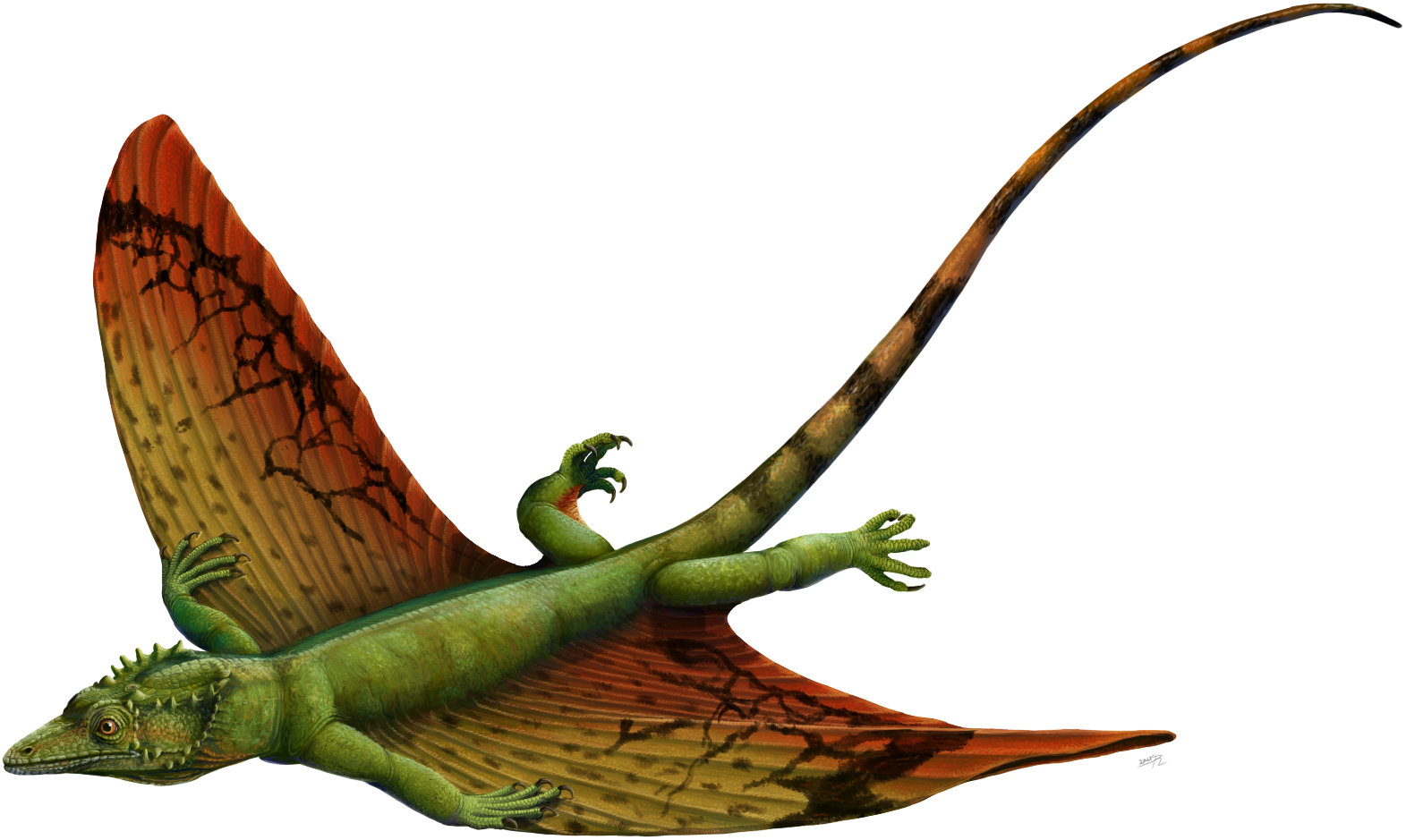
Life restoration of the weigeltisaurid Weigeltisaurus jaekeli from the Late Permian (259-252 million years ago). Weigeltisaurids represent the oldest known gliding vertebrates.

- Extinct reptiles similar to Draco: there are a number of unrelated extinct lizard-like reptiles with similar "wings" to the Draco lizards. These include the Late Permian Weigeltisauridae, the Triassic Kuehneosauridae and Mecistotrachelos, and the Cretaceous lizard Xianglong. The largest, Kuehneosuchus, had a wingspan of 40 centimetres (16 in).
- Sharovipterygidae: these strange reptiles from the Upper Triassic, found in Kyrgyzstan and Poland, had a membrane on their elongated hind limbs, extending their otherwise normal, flying-squirrel-like patagia significantly. In contrast, their forelimbs were much smaller.
- Hypuronector: this bizarre drepanosaur displayed limb proportions, particularly elongated forelimbs, consistent with a flying or gliding animal with patagia.

==== Non-avian dinosaurs ====
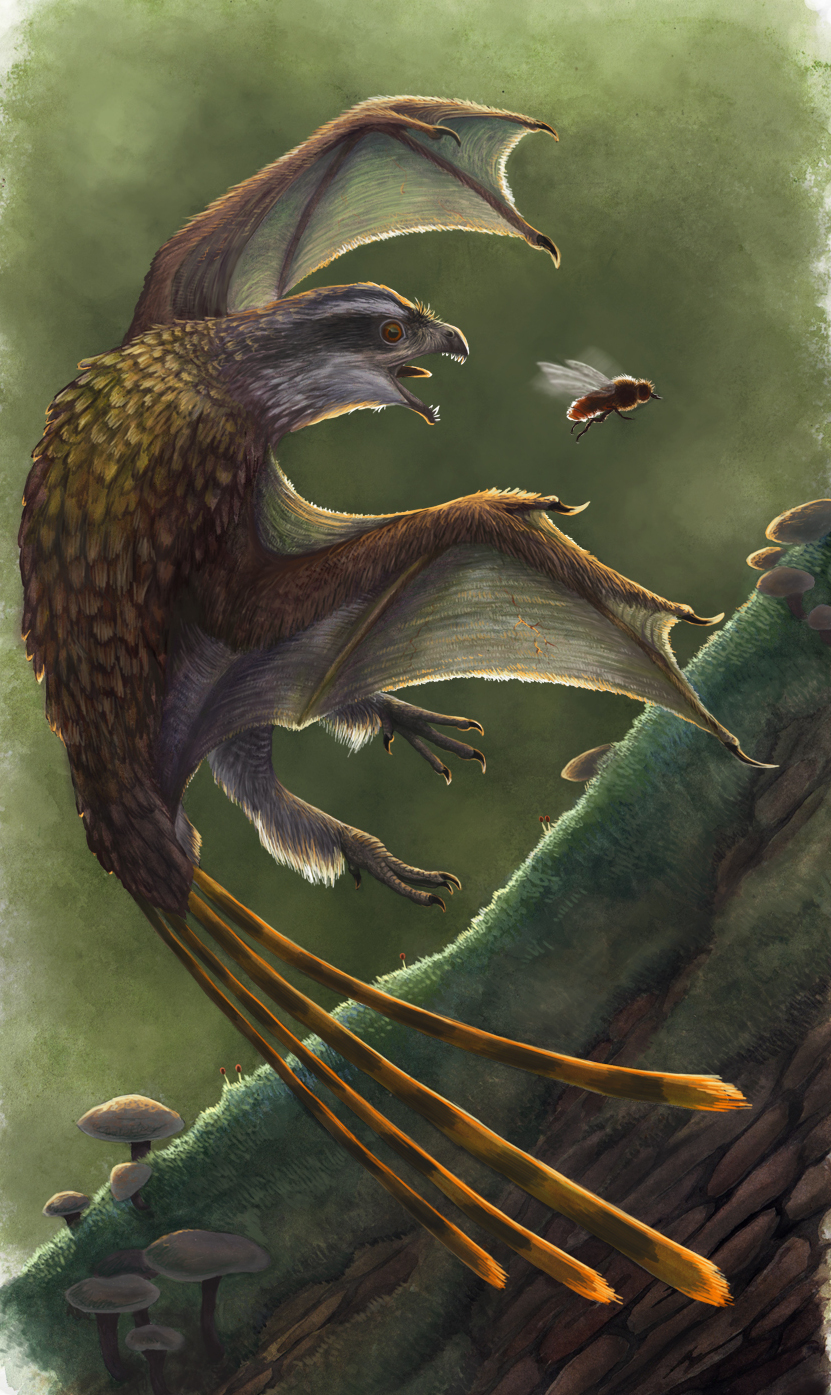
Life restoration of Yi qi, a gliding scansoriopterygid dinosaur from the Middle Jurassic of China.

- Scansoriopterygidae: unique among theropods, they developed membranous wings instead of feathered aerofoils. Much like modern anomalures, it developed a bony rod to help support the wing, albeit on the wrist and not the elbow.

==== Fish ====
- Thoracopteridae: a lineage of Triassic flying fish-like Perleidiformes which converted their pectoral and pelvic fins into broad wings very similar to those of their modern counterparts. The Ladinian genus Potanichthys is the oldest member of this clade, suggesting that these fish began exploring aerial niches soon after the Permian-Triassic extinction event.

==== Mammals ====
- Volaticotherium antiquum: a gliding eutriconodont, long considered the earliest gliding mammal until the discovery of the contemporary gliding haramiyidans. It lived around 164 million years ago during the Middle-Late Jurassic, in what is now China, and used a fur-covered skin membrane to glide through the air. The closely related Argentoconodon is also thought to have been able to glide, based on postcranial similarities.

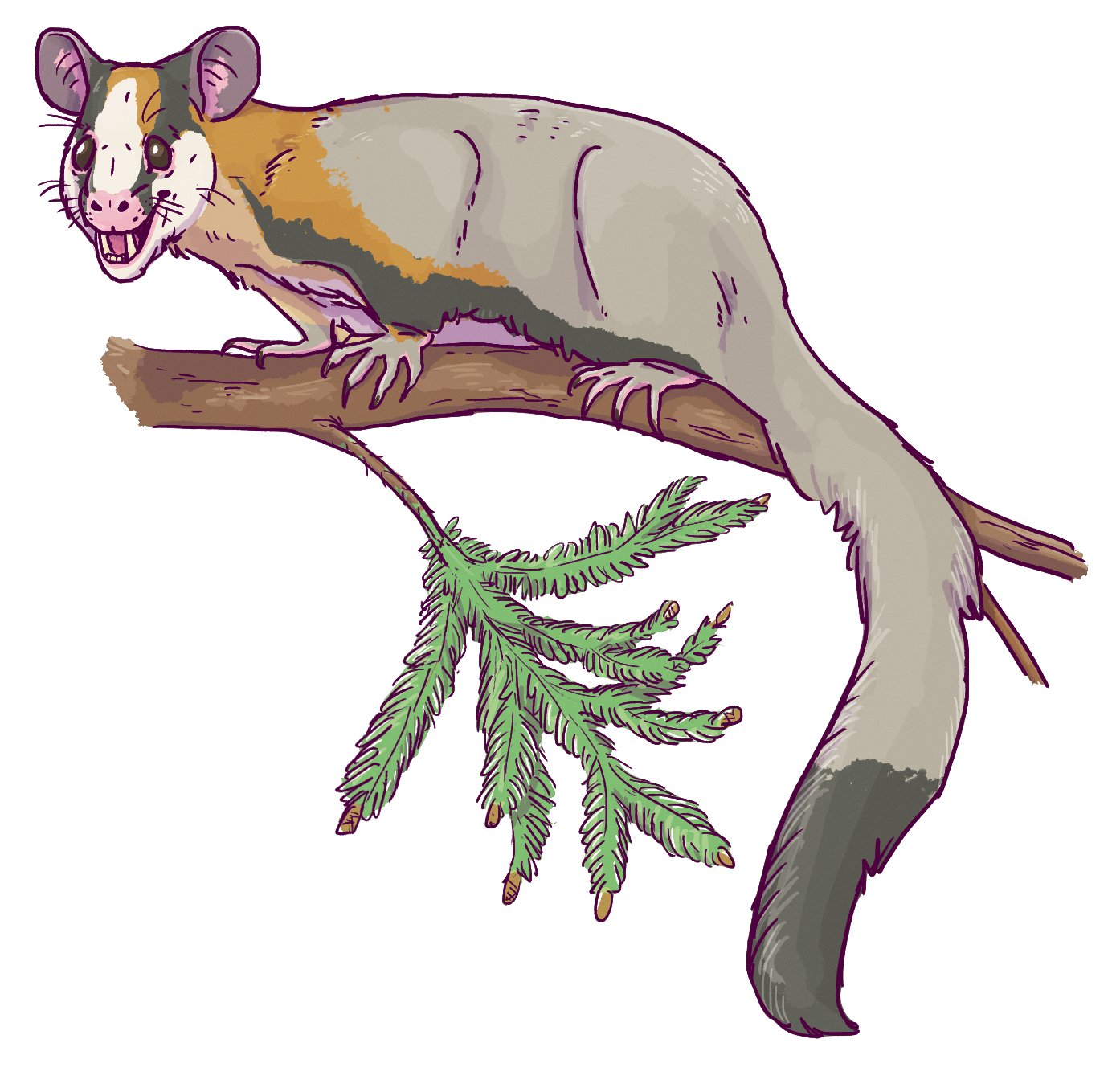
Volaticotherids predate bats as mammalian aeronauts by at least 110 million years.

- The haramiyidans Vilevolodon, Xianshou, Maiopatagium, and Arboroharamiya: known from the Middle-Late Jurassic and found in China, they had extensive patagia, highly convergent with those of colugos.
- A gliding metatherian, possibly a marsupial: known from the Paleocene and found in Itaboraí, Brazil.
- A gliding rodent belonging to the extinct family Eomyidae: Eomys quercyi, known from the late Oligocene and found in Germany.

== See also ==
- Animal locomotion
- Flying mythological creatures
- Insect thermoregulation
- Organisms at high altitude
- Aerial locomotion in marine animals
