= Winged lizard =

Winged lizard may refer to:

- Dragon, mythical animal
- Pterosaur, literally 'winged lizard', extinct animal
- Flying and gliding animals#Reptiles
  - Draco (lizard)
