= Beverly Halstead =

British paleontologist (1933–1991)

L. Beverly Halstead
- Born: June 13, 1933; Pendleton, Lancashire
- Died: April 30, 1991 (aged 57); Reading, Berkshire
- Education: University of Sheffield (BS), University College London (PhD)
- Known for: Research on Paleozoic fishes; evolution of teeth
- Scientific career
- Fields: Palaeontology

Lambert Beverly Halstead (13 June 1933 – 30 April 1991), who also went by Lambert Beverly Halstead Tarlo or just Beverly Halstead, was a British paleontologist and professor of Geology & Zoology and popularizer of science. He was noted for his candid theories of dinosaur sexual habits, research into plesiosaurs, and also for a prolonged assault on phylogenetic systematics (or "cladism", as he referred to it), in a series of letters and editorials to the scientific journal Nature in the late 1970s and early 1980s.

He was President of the Geologists' Association for 1990–91. He also was a co-host on the ITV series The Dinosaur Trail.

== Biography ==
=== Early life and education ===
Halstead was born in Pendleton, Lancashire in 1933 to parents Elizabeth "Betty" Waring (1911-1991) and Lambert "Bert" Halstead (1907-1983) close to the slopes of Pendle Hill. His mother an atheist, communist and supporter of the Republican cause in the Spanish Civil War, Halstead was raised as a "young adult" rather than a child and grew up in social isolation in rural Lancashire. During the Second World War, the Halstead home in Pendleton was an open house for many servicemen, including the strong communist Maurice Tarlo. Betty Halstead moved south to London and divorced Bert; remarrying to Maurice. They had no children of their own, but adopted three girls to become siblings of Halstead: Gay, Meryl (emigrated to Australia), and Jean (died young of cancer). At the age of ten, Halstead was expected to go by the surname of his stepfather as Beverly Tarlo.

Halstead grew up surrounded by books in Eastbourne, Sussex, and attended Lewes Grammar School. Walking in the countryside grew his interest in natural history, and he also he hitch-hiked solo across Europe, attended a peace conference in Paris, and spent an exchange year in Blois, France where he learned to speak French. As a poor fit for grammar school, Halstead applied for university admissions, and though he was given few interviews he was accepted into an Honours program in geology at the University of Sheffield, which has one of the few programs with strengths in palaeontology. Halstead may have focused his attention on vertebrate fossils after a field trip to Yorkshire where he discovered plesiosaur vertebrae, and he took part in many other expeditions. In 1955, as part of his belief in communism from his parents as well as an interest in Devonian fishes, Halstead travelled to Poland, where he developed strong friendships with many students, including Zofia Kielan-Jaworowska as well as Julian Kulczynski, but he also began to doubt the philosophy of communist utopia. Halstead also joined William Sarjeant on field trips, and developed a partnership with John R. L. Allen that led them to suggest that the origins of fishes were in marine environments. His attitude led to him requiring stomach-pumping after capsizing and swallowing water in the River Don, a fist-fight with another student, and making an apple-pie-bed for a professor on a field trip. He was awarded a First Class Honours degree in geology.

=== Career and research ===
Halstead would have liked to continue researching Paleozoic fishes in a higher degree, but funding was not available for it. Instead, he joined the Zoology Department of University College London under professor D.M.S. Watson, and with lecturers including making palaeontologists who were also communist sympathizers. He was given a thesis on Jurassic pliosaurs, and published many papers to form the basis for his PhD submission. He had a public argument with his supervisor Pamela Robinson over the animal Kuehneosaurus from the Triassic fissure-fills of Wales, as his invalid name "Plesiodraco" was published days before her detailed description of the taxon and was seen as a theft of ideas. His failure to write a true thesis together led to the delay of his PhD until 1959. Halstead was awarded a research fellowship at the Natural History Museum, London to study Paleozoic fishes from 1958 until 1961, which resulted in highly productive research. Halstead disputed with fish specialist Errol White over the identity of Jamoytius, but after Halstead's interpretation was shown to be right by further fossils, they became amicable.

Halstead then pursued the question of the origins of bones and teeth, applying dental techniques to fossil fishes. Halstead and Beryl Morris, a dentistry student at University College Hospital, worked together and soon married, with Morris having two daughters from a previous marriage. While he had previously published under his stepfather's name, Tarlo, he also chose to change his name, writing between 1966 and 1968 as L. B. Halstead Tarlo and then L. Beverly Halstead after that. Halstead continued to publish numerous studies on vertebrate hard tissues, Paleozoic fishes, and the evolution of teeth. A sedimentology research laboratory was developed at the University of Reading under Percival Allen, who found positions for both John R.L. Allen and Halstead. Halstead began teaching at Reading, including taking students on annual field trips to the Isle of Wight to study its geology. Halstead and Morris had conflict often, and after six years, Halstead moved out, and the marriage legally ended in 1975.

=== Death ===
In August 1991, Halstead was planning to attend the joint meeting of the Geologists' Association (in which he was the President since the last year) and the British Association for the Advancement of Science in Plymouth. After visiting Jenny and Tom in Reading, he had loaded his car up with items for his cottage in Lancashire and Plymouth the next day for preparations for the meeting. Approaching Bath, Somerset in the night, he was unable to see the unlit side of a semi-truck performing a u-turn, and drove into the side without braking. Another vehicle following Halstead was able to slow slightly but still collided, and both cars erupted in flames. The drivers were dragged clear but Halstead had broken his neck upon impact. At the time of his death, most of Halstead's quarrels were in the past. A memorial service was held on 1991 in Bath.
