= Rhabdopelix =

Rhabdopelix Temporal range: Late Triassic, 221.5–205.6 Ma

Scientific classification
- Kingdom: Animalia
- Phylum: Chordata
- Class: Reptilia
- Family: †Kuehneosauridae
- Genus: †Rhabdopelix; Cope, 1870 (Note: As noted by Colbert (1966), this name was published in the 1870 portion of a multi-year publication; references to 1899 are due to a typographical error in Wellnhofer (1991))

Type species
- †Rhabdopelix longispinis Cope, 1866

Synonyms
- Pterodactylus longispinis Cope, 1866

Extinct genus of reptiles

Rhabdopelix is a dubious genus of possible kuehneosaurid reptile, from the Late Triassic-age Lockatong Formation of Pennsylvania, United States. Based on partial, possibly chimeric remains, it was described by American naturalist and paleontologist Edward Drinker Cope as an early pterosaur. It held this status until the 1960s, when Ned Colbert reevaluated it for his description of Icarosaurus. He noted that the bones came from a block with the remains of other animals, and that Cope had misinterpreted some of the remains; for example, the rod-like "pubic bones" that had given it its name were actually much more like the bony structures used by Icarosaurus and related animals to glide. Additionally, he couldn't relocate the fossils, which are assumed to be lost. He recommended considering Rhabdopelix a dubious name. Peter Wellnhofer retained it as a pterosaur of unknown affinities in his 1978 review, but rejected this by 1991.

The holotype is likely a chimera consisting of Tanytrachelos, Icarosaurus, or fish fossils.
