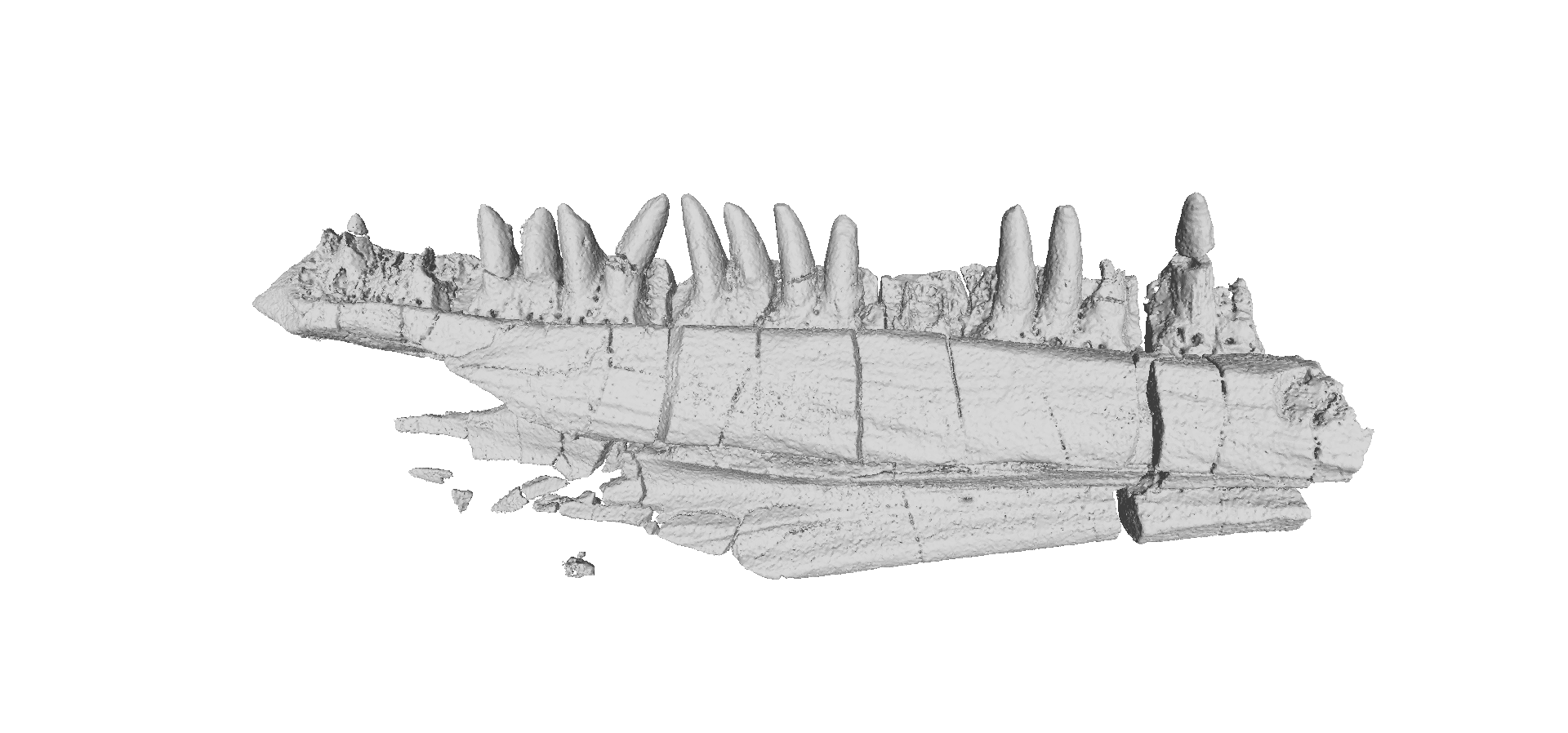
- Holotype dentary

Scientific classification
- Kingdom: Animalia
- Phylum: Chordata
- Class: Reptilia
- Genus: †Idiosaura
- Species: †I. virginiensis

Binomial name
- †Idiosaura virginiensis Kligman et al., 2024

= Idiosaura =

Idiosaura Temporal range: Late Triassic, Carnian

Genus of fossil reptile

Idiosaura is an extinct genus of reptile known from the Late Triassic (Carnian age) of what is now Virginia, United States. It contains a single species, Idiosaura virginiensis, known from a partial lower jaw. This specimen is similar to members of the Kuehneosauridae, though it is too fragmentary to be certain of these affinities.
