= Pamela Lamplugh Robinson =

Vertebrate palaeontologist (1919–1994)

Pamela Lamplugh Robinson (18 December 1919 – 24 October 1994) was a British paleontologist who worked extensively on the fauna of the Triassic and Early Jurassic of Gloucestershire and later worked in India on the Mesozoic and Gondwanan fauna. She helped establish the geology unit at the Indian Statistical Institute and directed research in vertebrate paleontology of India in the 1960s.

== Biography ==
Robinson was born in Manchester to James Arthur Robinson and Ann (née Lamplugh) in 1919. She went to a private school and later the Manchester Girls' High School. After the divorce of her parents in 1938 she went to the University of Hamburg for premedical studies but this was interrupted by the war. Returning to England, she worked at the British Woollen Industries Research Association in Leeds where she attended evening lectures in Paleontology at Leeds University by Dorothy Rayner, which captured her interest. She worked from 1942 to 1945 at the Royal Ordnance factory at Thorp Arch, West Yorkshire. She worked for about two years as a librarian at the Geological Society in London before enrolling for geology at the University College London in 1947. She was influenced at university by J. B. S. Haldane and Walter Georg Kühne. Graduating in 1951 with first-class honours, he continued post-graduate research and became an assistant lecturer in zoology in the department headed by Peter Medawar and later Avrion Mitchison. She received a Ph.D., the last of D. M. S. Watson's students, in 1957 for her studies on the gliding lizard Kuehneosaurus but she also studied the stratigraphy and fossils of the Mendip Hills in Gloucestershire. She published on the Late Triassic fauna of the Bristol Channel. She was invited through the influence of Haldane to the Indian Statistical Institute at Calcutta by Prasanta Chandra Mahalanobis and helped establish a geology department there. She mentored and influenced Indian researchers and created a program for the study of the paleontology of the Gondwana strata as well as the Maleri Formation in the Deccan region. A symposium on Gondwana Stratigraphy was held in 1967.

Robinson became Alexander Agassiz visiting professor at Harvard University in 1972 and was awarded the Wollaston award by the Geological Society for her work in India in 1973. She supervised three doctoral students including Beverly Halstead. From the 1960s she took an interest in the palaeoenvironment and palaeoclimate. In a landmark essay Climates Ancient and Modern published in 1964 she noted that the world's annual mean temperature had risen by 0.5 °C since the end of the nineteenth century and that winter mean temperatures had risen by 1 °C leading to rising tree-lines, shrinking inland lakes and an expansion of steppe and prairie land apart from a "spectacular" decline in glaciers and floating ice. She noted that Swiss glaciers had shrunk by a quarter of their area of 1877 by 1932.

She retired in 1982 and lived in London and spent time on gardening and studying Indian philosophy. She died at Newham General Hospital on 24 October 1994 after suffering from a stroke. She never married. Malerisaurus robinsonae, Pamelina, Lamplughsaura, Pamelaria, and Samsarasuchus pamelae are named in her honour.
