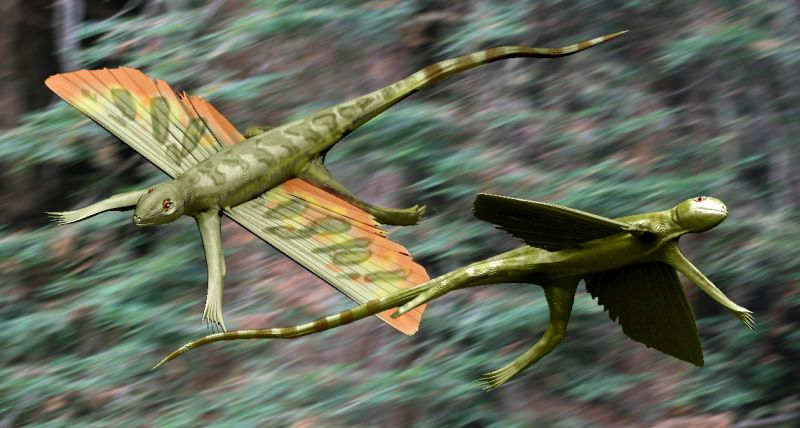
- Life restoration of Kuehneosuchus and Kuehneosaurus

Scientific classification
- Kingdom: Animalia
- Phylum: Chordata
- Class: Reptilia
- Clade: Sauria
- Family: †Kuehneosauridae; Romer, 1966

Genera
- †Icarosaurus; †Idiosaura?; †Kuehneosaurus; †Kuehneosuchus; †Pamelina; †Rhabdopelix?

= Kuehneosauridae =

Kuehneosauridae Temporal range: Triassic, Olenekian–Norian

Extinct family of reptiles

Kuehneosauridae is an extinct family of small, lizard-like gliding diapsids known from the Triassic period of Europe and North America.

== Description and systematics ==
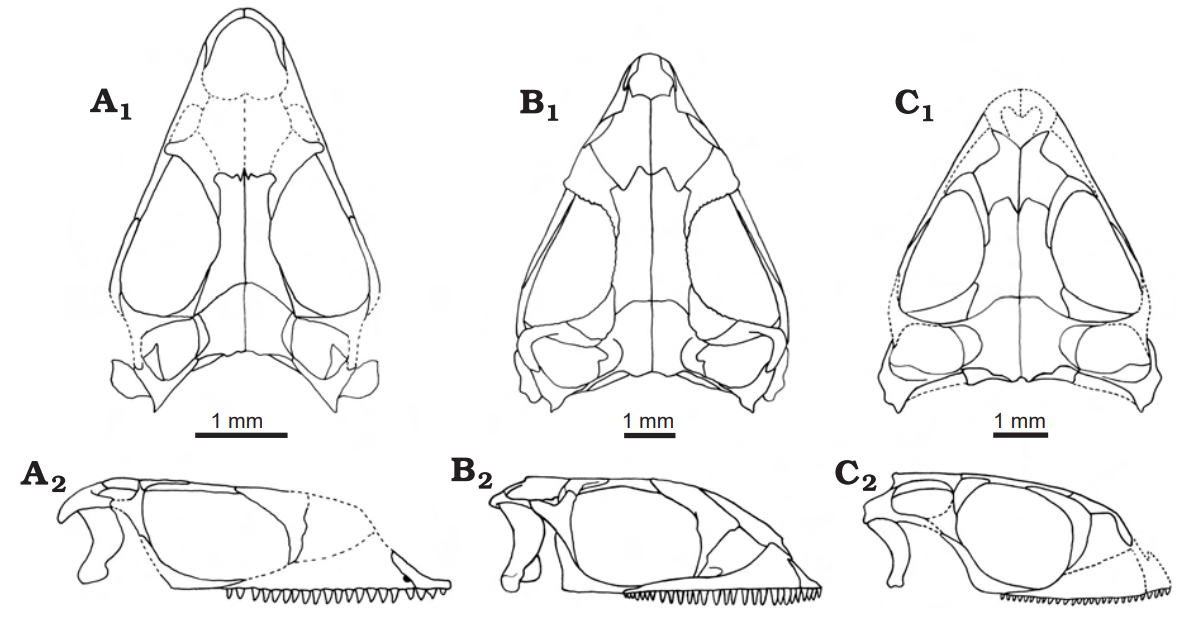
Comparison of the skulls of Pamelina (A), Kuehneosaurus (B), and Icarosaurus (C) in dorsal (top) and lateral (bottom) view

Size of three kuehneosaurids (Icarosaurus, Kuehneosuchus, and Kuehneosaurus) compared to other unrelated extinct gliding reptile groups (Weigeltisauridae, Mecistotrachelos, Xianglong) and Draco volans, a living gliding lizard.

They are distinguished from other diapsids by their 'wings' formed by elongated ribs. These allowed the animal to glide and parachute similar to living gliding lizards (Draco). They were most likely insectivorous, judging from their pin-like teeth. Initially considered squamates (the group which includes modern lizards and snakes), they have often, but not always, historically been placed in the group Lepidosauromorpha (the broader group which contains squamates and their relatives), though other studies have recovered them in other positions within Sauria, including Archosauromorpha (the group which includes crocodilians, birds and their relatives). A 2023 study reported that "Although their relationships are contentious, most recent analyses with robust sampling across Lepidosauromorpha, Archosauromorpha, Drepanosauromorpha and other Triassic reptile clades recover kuehneosaurids as archosauromorphs.", with some of these studies supporting a position within or closely related to Allokotosauria.

The oldest and most primitive known member is Pamelina from the Early Triassic (Olenekian stage) of Poland, which, while only known from fragmentary remains, already has vertebrae with characteristics consistent with gliding or parachuting. Icarosaurus is known from a single specimen from the Carnian-aged Lockatong Formation of New Jersey. The Late Triassic (Norian stage) kuehneosaurids from England, Kuehneosaurus and Kuehneosuchus, are almost identical to each other in their skeletal morphology and are largely distinguished from one another only on the length of their "wing" ribs, relatively short and massive in Kuehneosaurus but longer and more gracile in Kuehneosuchus. Kuehneosaurus was likely only capable of parachuting, while Kuehneosuchus could probably glide. Rhabdopelix may have been a kuehneosaurid; however, the fossils were lost, and the characteristics described are not entirely consistent with the other family members. Idiosaura is a possible kuehneosaurid known from a partial lower jaw found in the Carnian aged Vinita Formation of Virginia, though it is too fragmentary to unambiguously be placed as a member of the group.

Other similar but unrelated gliding reptiles are known from the fossil record, including the Permian Weigeltisauridae (though these gilded using novel rod shaped bones rather than ribs), the also Triassic Mecistotrachelos, and the Cretaceous lizard Xianglong.

=== Phylogeny ===
The cladogram below follows a 2009 analysis by paleontologists Susan E. Evans and Magdalena Borsuk−Białynicka, which found kuehneosaurids to be lepidosauromorphs:

- Diapsida
  - Araeoscelidia
  - Neodiapsida
    - Youngina
    - Coelurosauravus
    - Saurosternon
    - Sauria
      - Prolacerta (Archosauromorpha)
      - Lepidosauromorpha
        - - Paliguana
          - Kuehneosauridae
        - - Marmoretta
          - - Sophineta
            - Lepidosauria
              - Gephyrosaurus (Rhynchocephalia)
              - Squamata

Cladogram after Pritchard and Nesbitt, 2017, which recovered Kuehneosauridae within Allokotosauria as part of Archosauromorpha.

- Sauria
  - Lepidosauromorpha
  - Archosauromorpha
    - Protorosaurus
    - - Tanystropheidae
      - - Rhynchosauria
        - - - Prolacerta
            - Archosauriformes
          - - Boreopricea
            - Allokotosauria
              - Azendohsauridae
              - - Kuehneosauridae
                - Trilophosauria

Cladogram after Pritchard and Sues 2019, which recovered kuehneosaurids nested within Archosauromorpha as closely related to Allokotosauria:

- Sauria
  - Lepidosauromorpha
  - Archosauromorpha
    - Protorosaurus
    - - - - Boreopricea
          - Kuehneosauridae
        - Allokotosauria
      - - Tanystropheidae
        - - Rhynchosauria
          - - Prolacerta
            - Archosauriformes

Cladogram after Simoes et al. 2022, which recovered kuehneosaurids as basal archosauromorphs within "Protorosauria".

- Sauria
  - Lepidosauromorpha
  - Archelosauria
    - Pantestudines
    - Archosauromorpha
      - - Ichthyosauromorpha
        - - Sauropterygia
          - Thalattosauria
      - - Protorosauria
          - Protorosaurus
          - - Macrocnemus
            - - Tanystropheus
              - - Kuehneosauridae
                - - Langobardisaurus
                  - Drepanosauromorpha
        - - - Rhynchosauria
            - Allokotosauria
          - Archosauriformes

Cladogram after Buffa et al. 2024, which recovered kuehneosaurids as the earliest diverging total-group archosauromorphs:

- Sauria
  - Lepidosauromorpha
  - Pan‑Archosauria
    - Kuehneosauridae
    - Archosauromorpha
      - Protorosaurus
      - - Tanystropheidae
        - Crocopoda
          - Allokotosauria (including Drepanosauromorpha)
          - - Prolacerta
            - Rhynchosauria
            - Archosauriformes

== See also ==
- Draco (genus)
