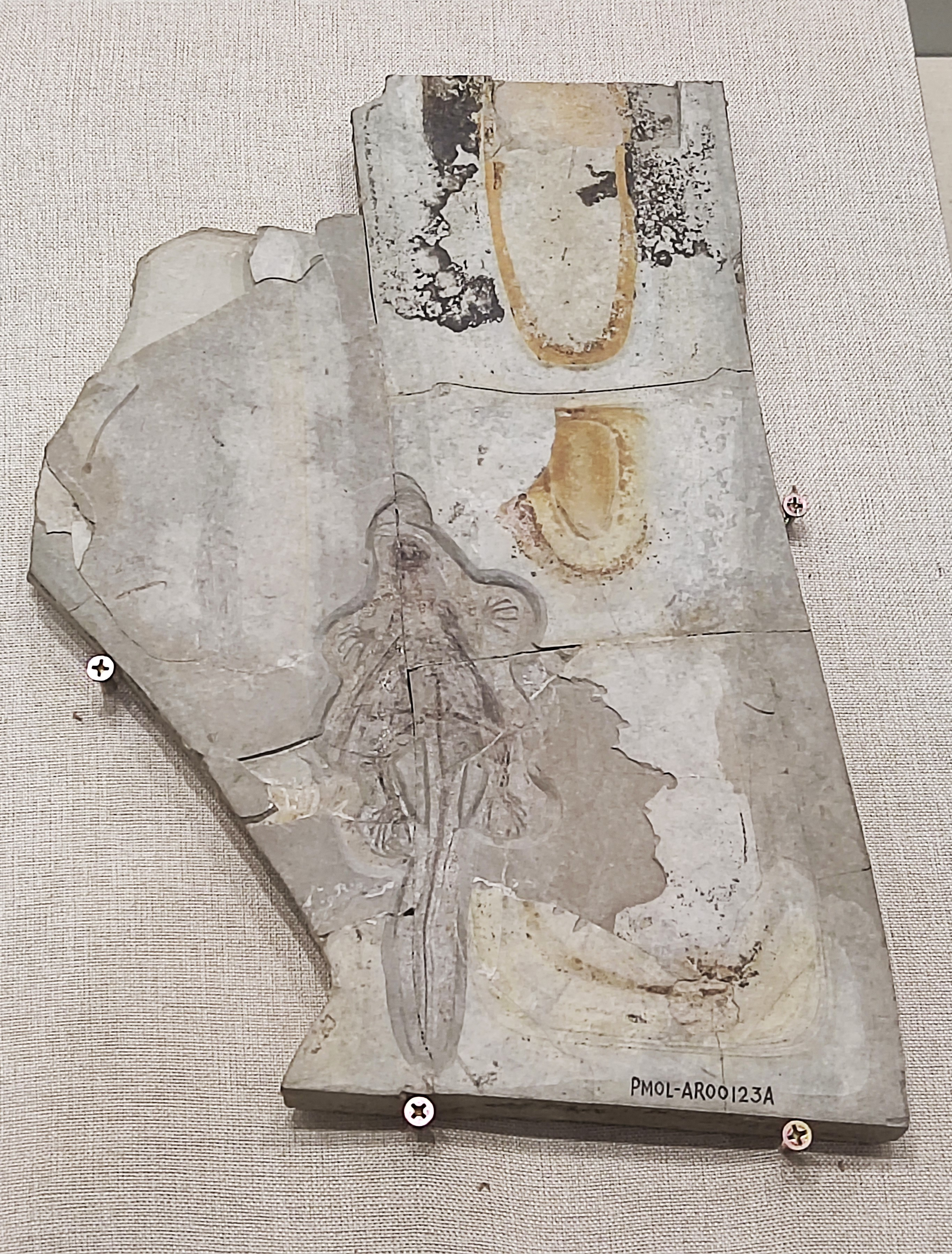
- Fossil in Liaoning Palaeontological Museum

Scientific classification
- Kingdom: Animalia
- Phylum: Chordata
- Class: Reptilia
- Order: Squamata
- Genus: †Xianglong; Li et al., 2007

Species
- X. zhaoi Li et al., 2007 (type)

= Xianglong =

Xianglong Temporal range: Early Cretaceous, Barremian

Extinct genus of lizards

Xianglong (Chinese: "flying dragon") is a genus of gliding Cretaceous lizard containing one described species, Xianglong zhaoi.It is known from LPM 000666, a single complete skeleton with skin impressions discovered in the Zhuanchengzi, near Yizhou, Yixian, in the Liaoning Province of China. The specimen comes from the Barremian-aged (Lower Cretaceous) Yixian Formation, near Yizhou. Xianglong's most notable feature is its oversized ribs, eight on each side, which were attached to a membrane (patagium) that allowed the lizard to glide in a way similar to living Draco lizards.

While Xianglong was originally considered to be an acrodontan lizard, with a cladistic analysis in the study that described it suggesting that it was grouped with iguanians such as agamines, chamaeleonids, and leiolepidines, it was later shown that this was due to misinterpretation of the crushed skull, and its affinities with other lizards remains uncertain.

== Description ==
Size of Xianglong (blue, bottom) compared to a human hand, the living gliding lizard Draco volans, as well as other unrelated extinct gliding reptiles

The holotype specimen of Xianglong was 15.5 centimetres (6.1 in) long, 9.5 centimetres (3.7 in) of which was tail, although the describers say it was likely a juvenile. This is indicated by the unossified carpals and poorly-ossified tarsals. Metacarpal IV is shorter than the other metacarpals, and pedal digit V is greatly elongated. The radius and ulna are distally divergent. The body is covered in small, granular scales, showing little size variation. Xianglong had slightly curved claws, indicating that it was arboreal. The ribs of the animal, that functioned as gliding organs, were found in a half-open position, which indicates a post-mortem relaxation of the folded wing. This is currently the only known fossil gliding lizard, though there are other unrelated animals that also use their ribs to glide.

== Taxonomy ==
In the original paper describing it, Xianglong was recovered in a polytomy with the Agaminae, Chamaeleonidae and Leiolepidinae. This was based on the strict consensus of the four most parsimonious trees. Below is the tree recovered by Li et al. (2007):

- - Kuehneosauridae
  - - Marmoretta
    - - Rhynchocephalia
      - - - Iguanidae
          - - Xianglong
            - Agaminae
            - Chamaeleonidae
            - Leiolepidinae
        - - - Polyglyphanodon
            - - Macrocephalosaurus
              - Sineoamphisbaena
          - - - - Dibamidae
                - Amphisbaenia
              - - Eublepharinae
                - - Gekkoninae (sensu lato)
                  - - Diplodactylinae
                    - Pygopodidae
            - - - Lacertidae
                - - Teiidae
                  - Gymnophthalmidae
              - - - Cordylidae
                  - Scincidae
                - - Anguidae
                  - - - Xenosaurus
                      - Shinisaurus
                    - - Heloderma
                      - - - Lanthanotus
                          - Varanus
                        - - - Aigialosauridae
                            - Mosasauridae
                          - - Dolichosauridae
                            - - Adriosaurus
                              - - Pachyrhachis
                                - Haasiophis
                                - Serpentes

However, in a later 2022 publication, Susan E. Evans said that what the describing authors misinterpreted as acrodont dentition was actually the crushed, jagged broken edge of the jaw, rendering its identification as an iguanian doubtful.

== Paleobiology ==
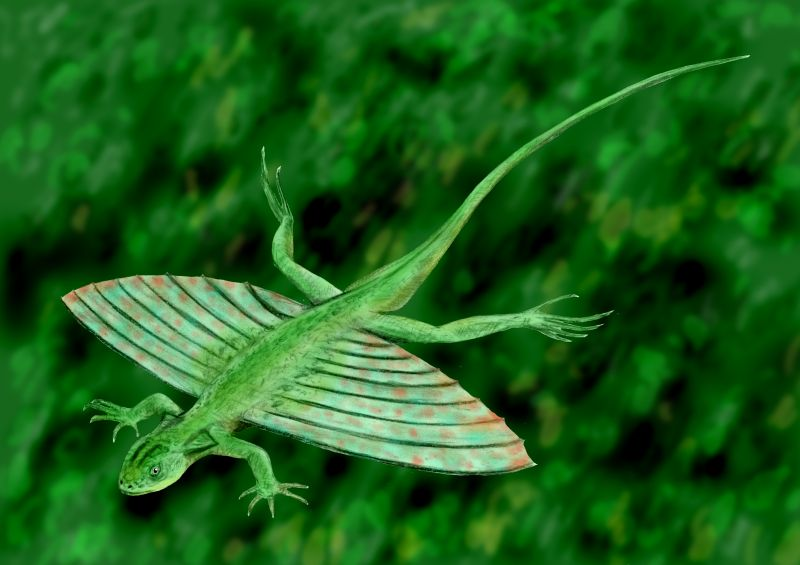
Life restoration in gliding pose

Xianglong is one of the few creatures that glide using their ribs. Other creatures, such as the flying squirrel and the Malabar flying frog, Rhacophorus malabaricus, have a different membrane attachment, toes to toes or limb to limb. The living lizard genus Draco (commonly known as flying or gliding lizards) uses its elongated ribs to glide in the same way, though it is not closely related to Xianlong and evolved its gliding apparatus independently. Other analogous fossil reptiles are known from the Triassic period: the kuehneosaurids and Mecistotrachelos, but the Triassic look-alikes lived over 100 million years before Xianglong. Despite the 11-centimetre (4.3 in) "rib-span", the lizard might have been quite agile in the air, possibly to escape the feathered dinosaurs that coexisted with it.

Xu Xing, a Chinese paleontologist and one of the describers of Xianglong, states it is possible that it could have glided as far as half a football field, much further than the modern Draco.
