= List of flying mythological creatures =

This is a list of flying mythological creatures. This listing includes flying and weather-affecting creatures.

- Adzehate creatures
- Angel
- Arkan Sonney
- Basilisk
- Boobrie
- Cockatrice
- Djinn
- Devil
- Dragon
- Elemental - a being of the alchemical works of Paracelsus
- Erinyes
- Fairies
- Fenghuang
- Fionnuala
- Firebird - large bird with magically luminescent red- and yellow-hued feathers (sometimes used as a synonym of phoenix; see below)
- Fūjin
- Gamayun
- Gargoyle
- Garuda
- German
- Gorgons - three sisters (Stheno, Euryale, and Medusa) with snakes for hair, sharp fangs, golden wings, and petrifying gazes.
- Griffin – a creature which combines the features of lion and eagle
- Harpy – A winged being
- Hippogriff – A creature which is half horse and half griffin
- Huitzilopochtli
- Itsumade
- Lamassu
- Lightning Bird
- Lindworm
- Minokawa
- Nephele
- Nue
- Odin's ravens, Huginn and Muninn
- Ong (Washoe folklore)
- Pegasus – A winged horse
- Peryton
- Phelddagrif
- Phoenix
- Raiju
- Roc – A gigantic bird similar to the Ziz
- Sarimanok
- Shahbaz
- Sirens - bird women in Greek mythology, not to be confused with mermaids
- Simurgh – A Persian bird similar to the Ziz
- Snallygaster
- Sphinx (Greek)
- Stymphalian Birds
- Sylph
- Thunderbird
- Winged Unicorn
- Wyvern
- Yalungur
- Yuki-onna
- Zilant
- Ziz – A gigantic bird mentioned briefly in the Psalms
- Zduhać

== See also ==
- List of fictional birds
- List of fictional birds of prey
