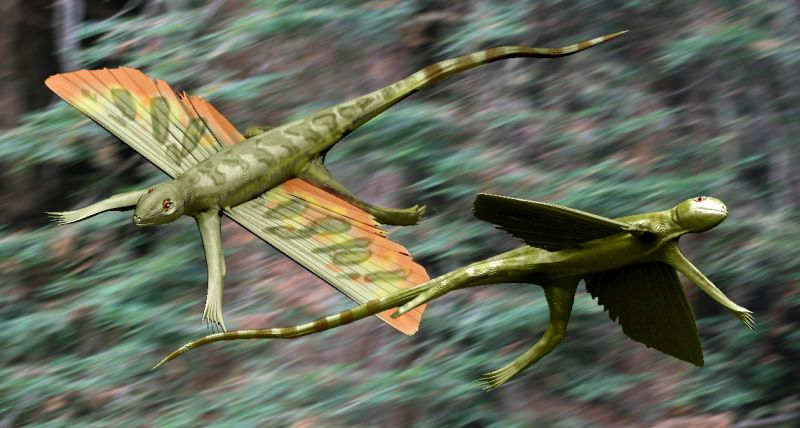
- Life restoration of Kuehneosuchus (left) and Kuehneosaurus (right)

Scientific classification
- Kingdom: Animalia
- Phylum: Chordata
- Class: Reptilia
- Family: †Kuehneosauridae
- Genus: †Kuehneosaurus; Robinson 1962

Type species
- †Kuehneosaurus latus Robinson 1962

= Kuehneosaurus =

Kuehneosaurus Temporal range: Norian ~215.56–201.6 Ma

Genus of reptiles

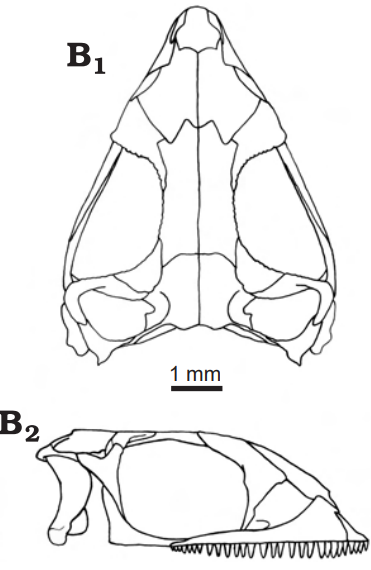
Skull reconstruction

Size of Kuehneosaurus (orange, right( compared to fellow kuehneosaurids Kuehneosuchus and Icarosaurus, as well as to other unrelated extinct gliding reptiles and Draco volans, a living gliding lizard.

Kuehneosaurus is an extinct genus of Late Triassic kuehneosaurid reptile known from the Late Triassic (Norian stage) of the Penarth Group of southwest England and the Steinmergel Group of Luxembourg. Temperature at this stage and region would have ranged from 28 to 35 °C. It was named by Pamela Lamplugh Robinson in 1962 in honour of paleontologist Walter Georg Kühne, and the type and only species is Kuehneosaurus latus. Measuring 72 centimetres long (2.3 feet), it had "wings" formed from ribs which jutted out from its body by as much as 14.3 cm, connected by a membrane which allowed it to slow its descent when jumping from trees. It is a member of a family of extinct gliding reptiles, the Kuehneosauridae, within a larger living group the Lepidosauromorpha, which contain modern lizards and tuatara.

Unlike its longer "winged" relative Kuehneosuchus (which may be a species of the same genus or represent a different sexual morph), aerodynamic studies have shown that Kuehneosaurus was probably not a glider, but instead used its elongated ribs to parachute from the trees. A study by Stein et al. in 2008 found that its parachuting speed, descending at a 45-degree angle, would be between 10 and 12 metres per second. Pitch was controlled by lappets (wattle-like flaps of skin) on the hyoid apparatus, as in the modern gliding lizard Draco.

== See also ==
- Coelurosauravus
