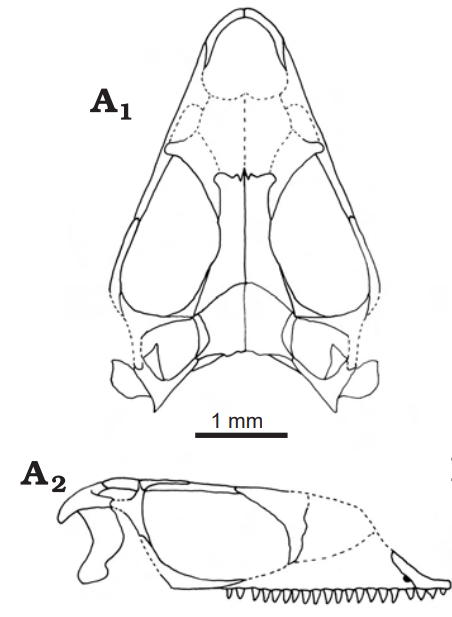
- Restoration of the skull

Scientific classification
- Kingdom: Animalia
- Phylum: Chordata
- Class: Reptilia
- Family: †Kuehneosauridae
- Genus: †Pamelina; Evans, 2009

Species
- P. polonica Evans, 2009 (type)

= Pamelina =

Pamelina Temporal range: Early Triassic

Extinct genus of reptiles

Pamelina is an extinct genus of basal kuehneosaurid known from Early Triassic (Olenekian age) rocks of Czatkowice 1, Poland. It was first named by Susan E. Evans in 2009 and the type species is Pamelina polonica. It is the oldest known member of Kuehneosauridae. The vertebrae have characteristics consistent with gliding or parachuting.

== Phylogeny ==
Cladogram after Evans (2009).

- - - - - Lepidosauria
        - Sophineta
      - Marmoretta
    - - - Kuehneosauridae
        - Pamelina
      - Drepanosauridae
  - - - Archosauromorpha
      - Choristodera
      - - - - Sauropterygia
            - Testudines
          - Ichthyosauria
        - Thalattosauria
    - Protorosaurus
