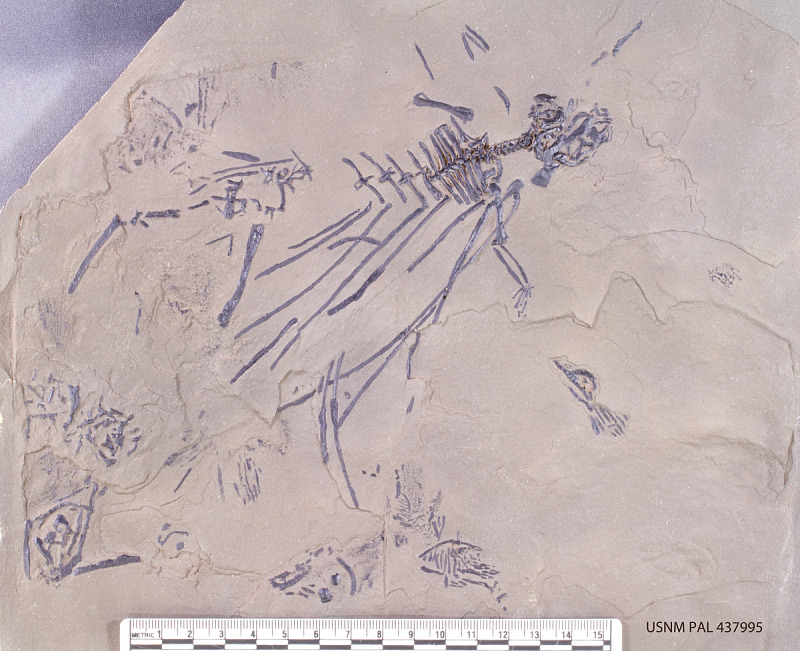
- A Smithsonian-held replica of the only known fossil of Icarosaurus

Scientific classification
- Kingdom: Animalia
- Phylum: Chordata
- Class: Reptilia
- Family: †Kuehneosauridae
- Genus: †Icarosaurus; Colbert, 1966

Type species
- †Icarosaurus siefkeri Colbert, 1966

= Icarosaurus =

Icarosaurus Temporal range: Late Triassic, Norian

Extinct genus of reptiles

Icarosaurus (meaning "Icarus lizard") is an extinct genus of kuehneosaurid reptile from the Late Triassic (Norian age) Lower Lockatong Formation of New Jersey. It is known from a partial skeleton missing part of the tail, some ribs, a hand, and parts of the legs, it was a small animal, about 10 centimeters (4 in) long from the skull to the hips. Like its relative Kuehneosaurus, it was able to glide short distances using 'wings' consisting of highly elongated ribs covered with skin. These gliding membranes would have had a convex upper surface and a concave lower surface, thus creating a simple airfoil structure well-suited to gliding. This method of gliding is also seen in the Late Permian reptile Coelurosauravus and the modern Draco lizard, neither of which are closely related to Icarosaurus.

== Discovery and history ==
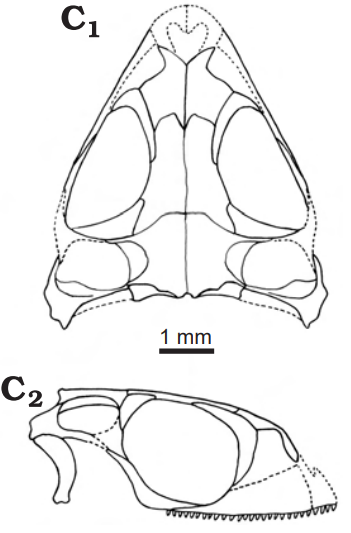
Skull reconstruction

The only known fossil skeleton which definitely belongs to Icarosaurus was found in 1960 in North Bergen, New Jersey by Alfred Siefker, a teenager at the time, who stumbled upon the specimen while exploring a quarry. Siefker brought the specimen to scientists at the American Museum of Natural History in New York for identification and preparation. It was described by paleontologist Edwin Harris Colbert in 1966, who named it Icarosaurus siefkeri in honor of Siefker.

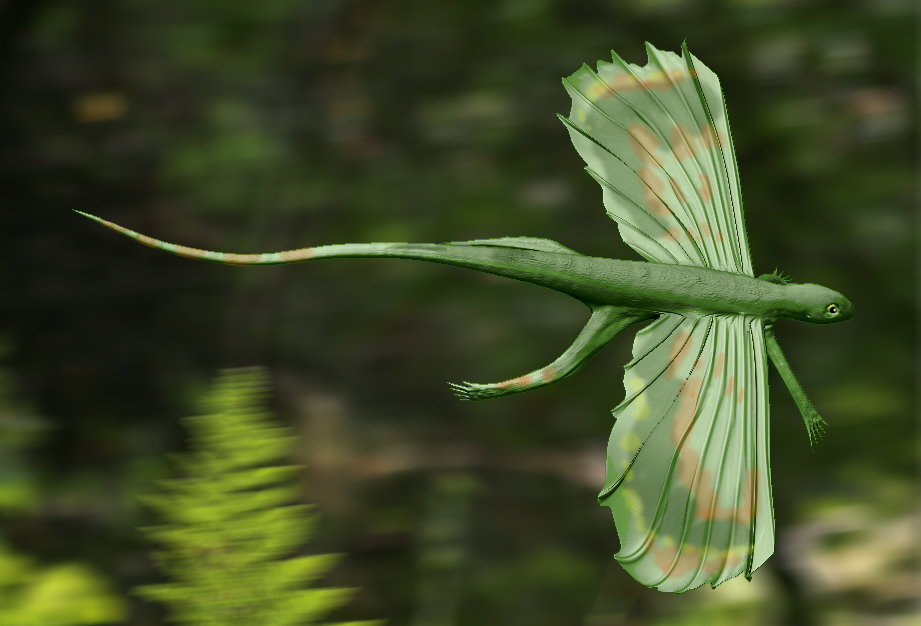
Life restoration of Icarosaurus

The fossil remained in the collections of the AMNH until the late 1980s. In 1989, Siefker reclaimed the specimen, which he kept in a private collection during the following decade. In 2000, Siefker sold the fossil at auction in San Francisco through the auction house Butterfield & Butterfield, despite concerns from paleontologists that the sale could render the specimen unavailable for scientific study. The fossil sold for US$167,000, only half of its appraised value, to Dick Spight of California. That same year, Spight donated the Icarosaurus holotype back to the AMNH, where it was put on display 7 October 2000.

== Description ==
Size of Icarosaurus (red, top) compared to fellow kuehneosaurids Kuehneosaurus and Kuehneosuchus, as well as to other unrelated extinct gliding reptiles and Draco volans, a living gliding lizard.

Icarosaurus is estimated to have been around 33.1 centimetres (13.0 in) long (of which 9.5 centimetres (3.7 in) was forward of the sacrum/hip), with a wingspan of approximately 27.2 centimetres (10.7 in)
