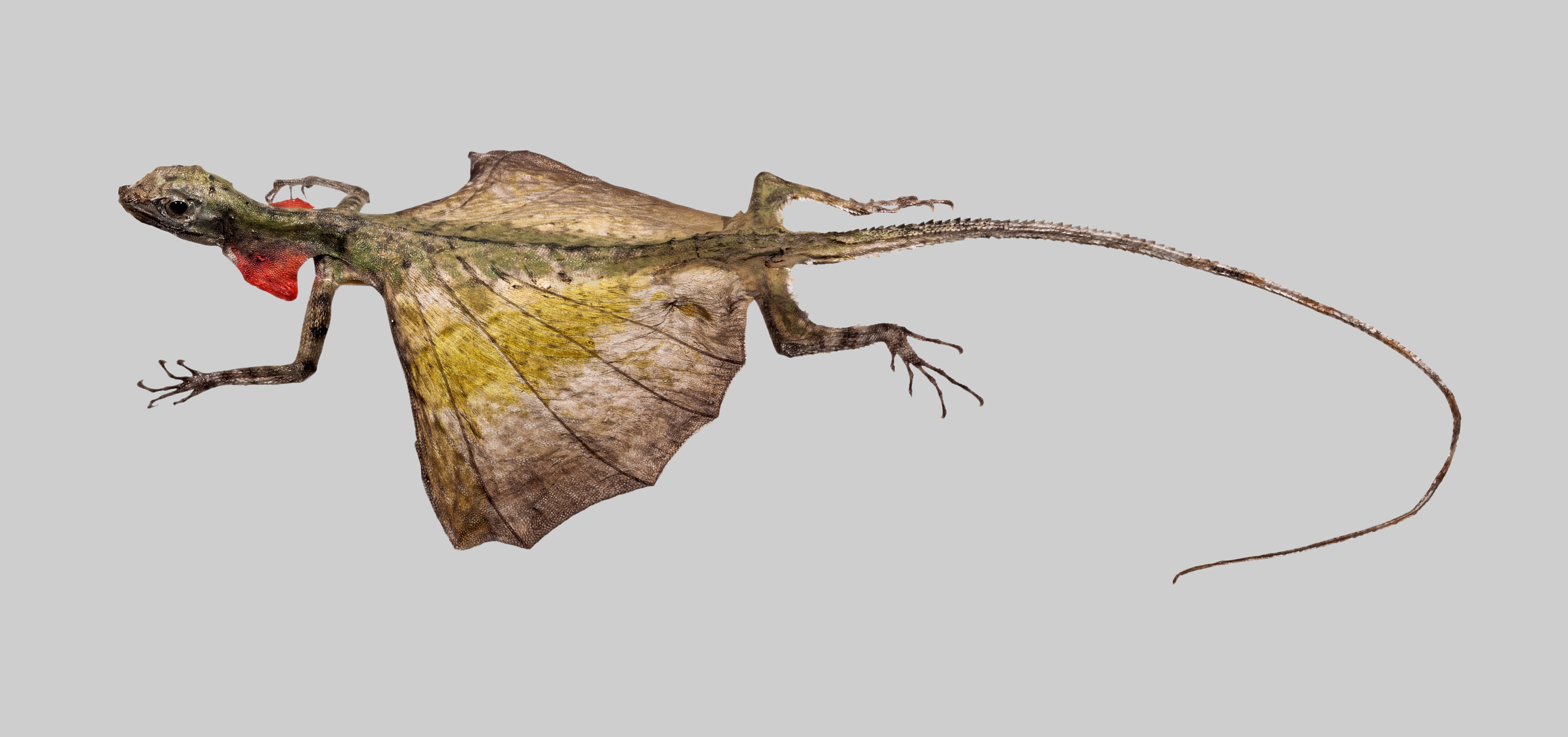

Conservation status
- Least Concern (IUCN 3.1)

Scientific classification
- Kingdom: Animalia
- Phylum: Chordata
- Class: Reptilia
- Order: Squamata
- Suborder: Iguania
- Family: Agamidae
- Genus: Draco
- Species: D. volans

Binomial name
- Draco volans Linnaeus, 1758

= Draco volans =

Species of reptile

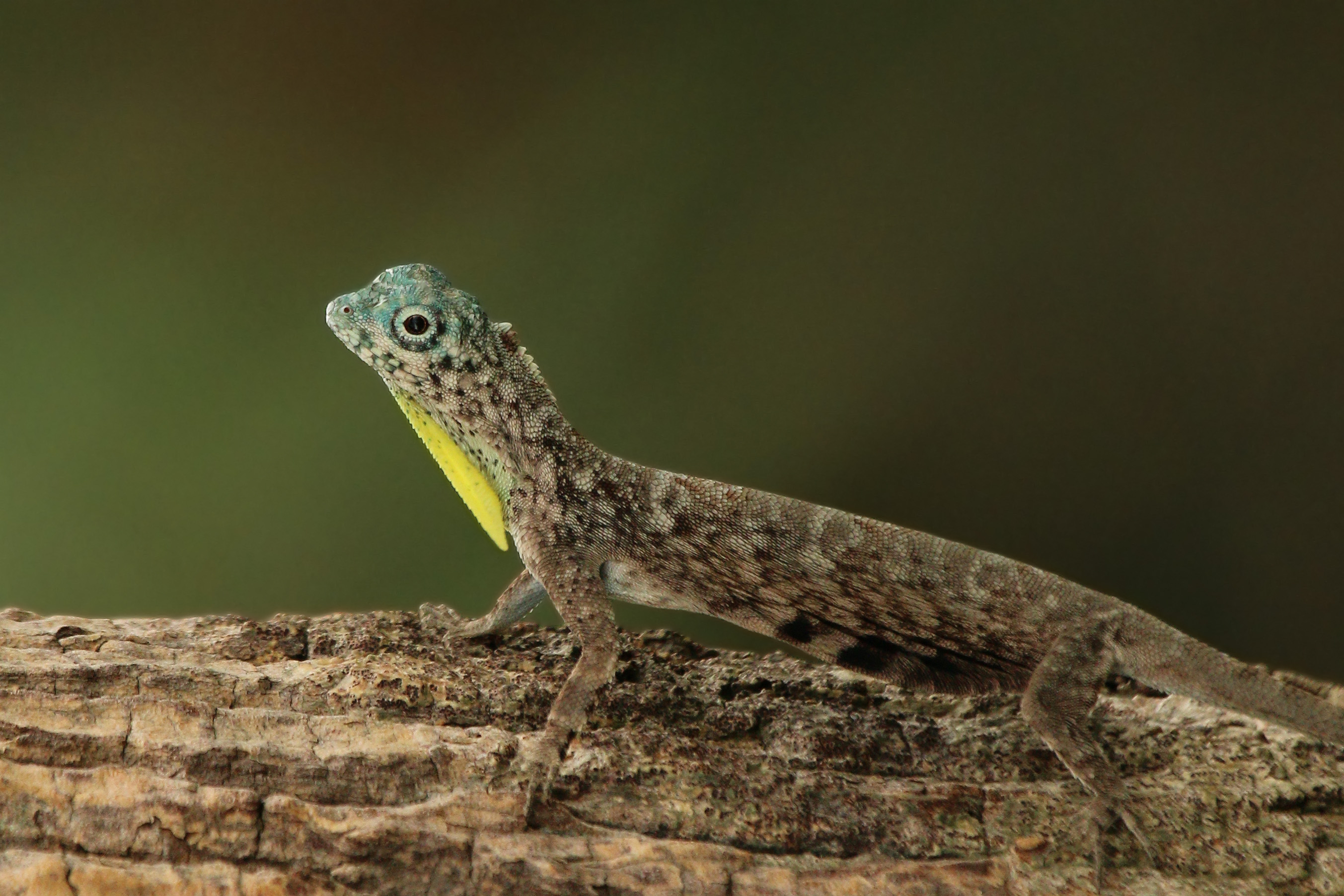
Male

Draco volans also commonly known as the common flying dragon, is a species of lizard in the family Agamidae. The species is endemic to Southeast Asia. Like other members of genus Draco, this species has the ability to glide using winglike lateral extensions of skin called patagia.

The species is exclusively arboreal.

== Description ==
Size of Draco volans (purple, bottom right) compared to the unrelated extinct lizard Xianglong and various other unrelated extinct gliding reptiles

D. volans grows to a length of up to 22 cm (8.7 in), including the tail. The body is tan in colour with dark flecks.

The patagium of the male is tan to bright orange with dark banding. The female's patagium has irregular markings rather than banding.

== Habitat ==
D. volans can be found in tropical rainforests in Southeast Asia. It is commonly found in early second growth forests, in open secondary forest, and on forest edges.

== Locomotion ==
The "wings" of D. volans are supported by its ribs, which form the skeleton of the patagia. However, its elongated ribs are superadded to aid forming its "wings", and not to assist respiration.

This species is considered a passive glider, or parachutist. However, previous studies have also shown that it can be considered a gliding animal. This means that it does not have to deal with the aerodynamic and metabolic imperatives required for active flight.

== Behaviour ==
D. volans is diurnal, and is "commonly seen running along branches, displaying, and gliding".

=== Courtship ===
The colouration of the patagia and the dewlap play key roles in the courtship of D. volans, with the males stretching out and displaying their patagia and dewlaps to get the attention of the females.

=== Diet ===
Draco volans feeds mainly on ants, and possibly other insects like termites. A study was conducted in Eastern Mindanao, Philippines, which found that the species exclusively feeds on ants. It hunts by waiting near a tree trunk until ants come out and crawl close to its visual field; it grabs its prey without moving itself.

=== Reproduction ===
The female common flying dragon digs a hole in the soil to serve as a nest, and lays eggs in it.
