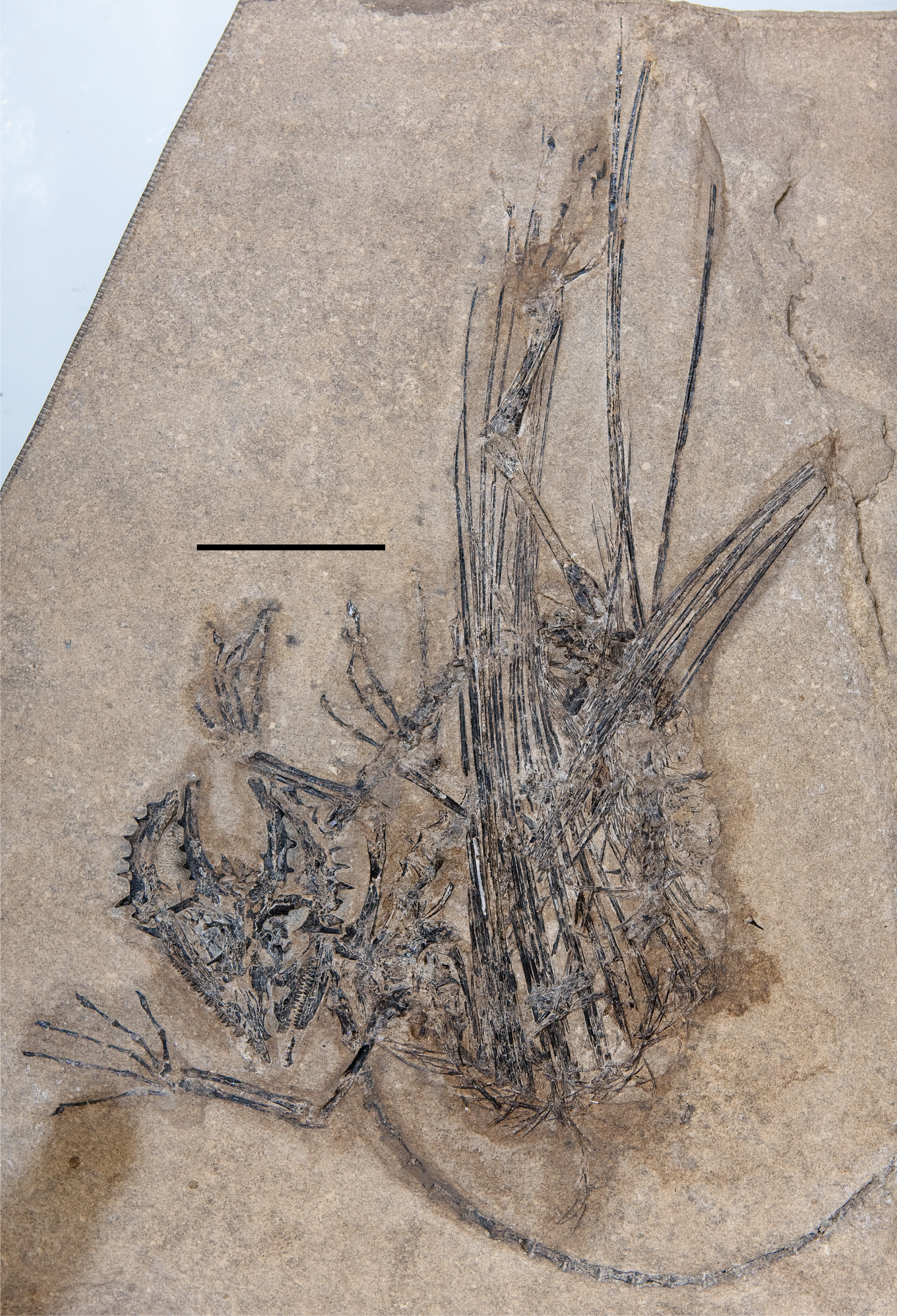
- Skeleton of Weigeltisaurus

Scientific classification
- Kingdom: Animalia
- Phylum: Chordata
- Class: Reptilia
- Clade: Neodiapsida
- Family: †Weigeltisauridae; Kuhn, 1939

Genera
- †Coelurosauravus; †Glaurung; †Rautiania; †Weigeltisaurus

Synonyms
- Coelurosauravidae Evans, 1982

= Weigeltisauridae =

Weigeltisauridae Temporal range: Lopingian 259.51–251.9 Ma

Extinct family of reptiles

Weigeltisauridae is a family of gliding neodiapsid reptiles that lived during the Late Permian, between 259.51 and 251.9 million years ago. Fossils of weigeltisaurids have been found in Madagascar, Germany, Great Britain, and Russia. They are characterized by long, hollow rod-shaped bones dubbed "patagials", which are unique to weigeltisaurids, extending from the lower torso that are suggested to have supported wing-like membranes. Similar membranes have also evolved in other extinct reptiles such as kuehneosaurids and Mecistotrachelos, as well as living gliding lizards, which are instead supported by the ribs.

== Description ==
Skull diagram of Coelurosauravus

Comparison of the size and body proportions of two weigeltisaurids (Coelurosauravus and Weigeltisaurus, left) compared to a human hand, the much smaller living gliding lizard Draco volans, and various unrelated extinct gliding reptiles

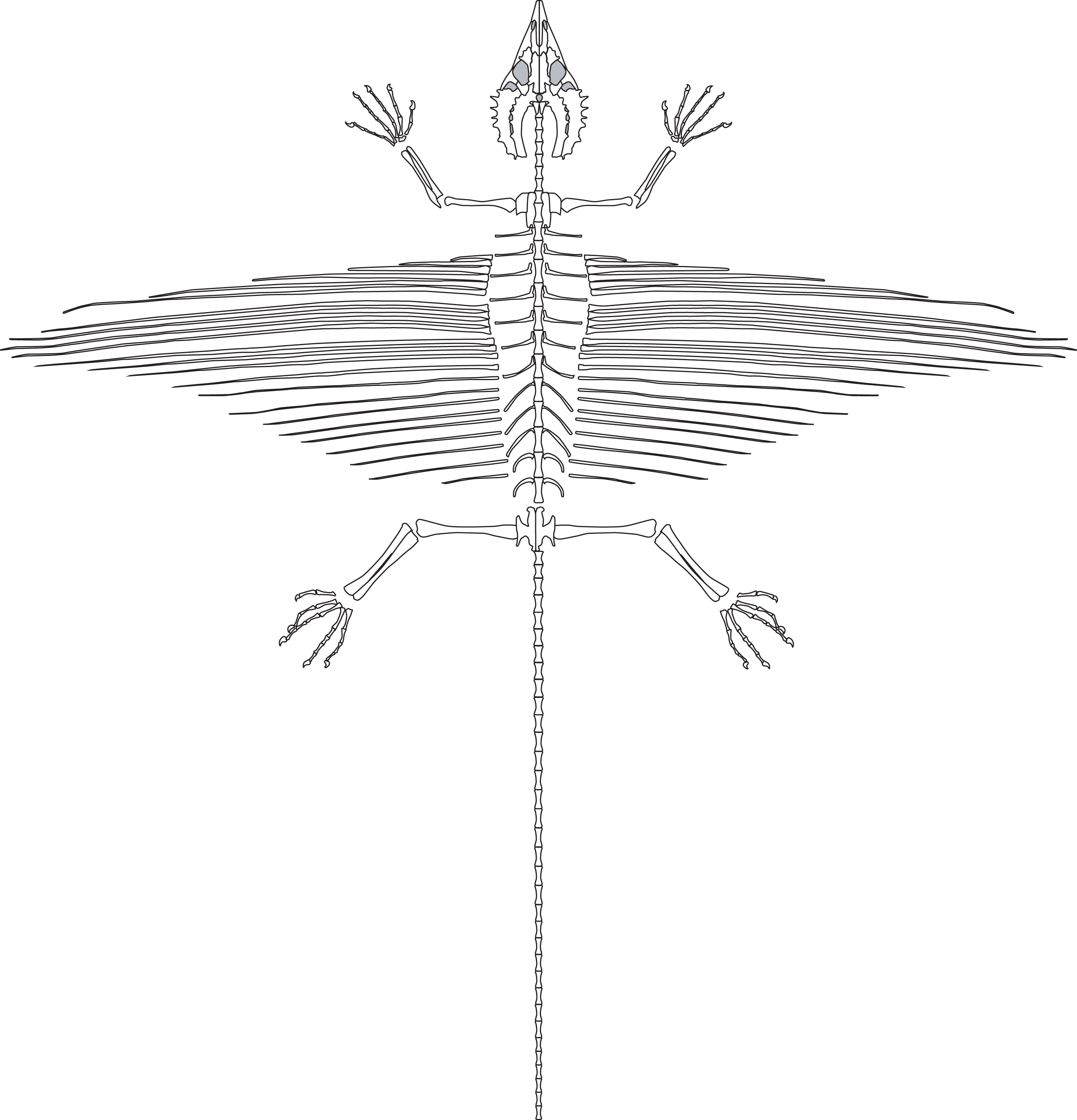
Diagram of the skeleton of Weigeltisaurus (gastralia are omitted)

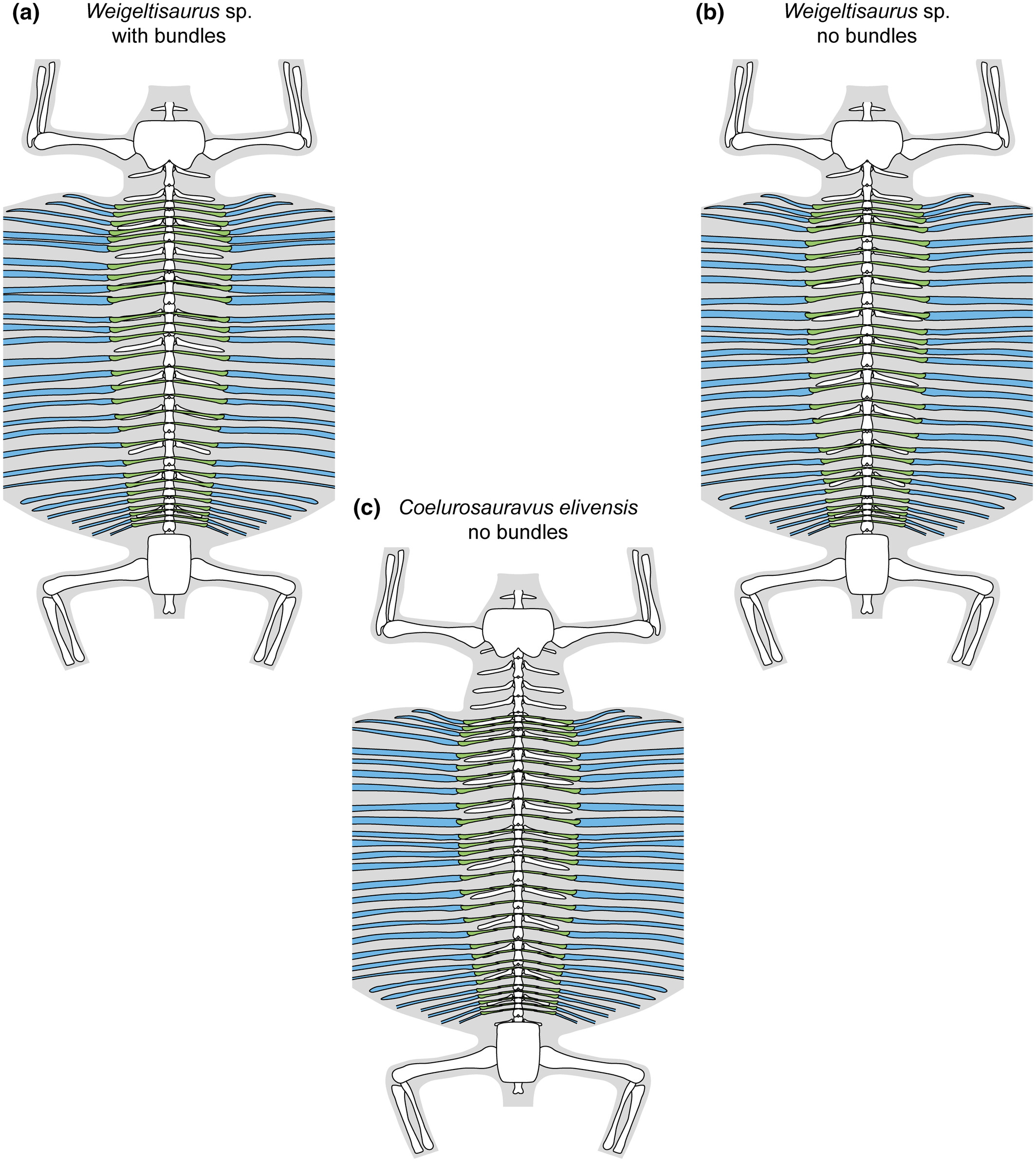
Diagram of the trunk and patagials of weigeltisaurids, showing the attachment of the patagials (blue) to the gastralia (green) on the underside of the body as opposed to the ribs (white), showing alternative bundling and no-bundling interpretations of the patagial arrangement in Weigeltisaurus

Weigeltisaurid skulls range from around 3.4–3.7 centimetres (1.3–1.5 in) long in Coelurosauravus to 6 centimetres (2.4 in) in length in Weigeltisaurus. Coelurosauravus had a combined head and trunk length (snout-vent length) of around 18 centimetres (7.1 in) and a total length of at least 32 centimetres (13 in) including the tail. The skulls and jaws of weigeltisaurids are ornamented with horns and tubercles, including chameleon-like frills. The torso and limbs are slender. The skeletons of weigeltisaurds are lightened by large air spaces (skeletal pneumaticity) within the bones. The phalanges of the hands and feet are elongate contrasting strongly with those of most other primitive diapsids, but are similar to those of modern arboreal (tree-climbing) lizards. Unique to weigeltisaurids, the group possesses between 25 and 30 pairs of long, hollow rod-like bones, which project from the lower abdomen dubbed "patagials" These patagial bones, which appear to be novel (neomorphic) bones not found in any other reptile group, have a 1 to 1 correspondence with the gastralia (elongate, thin, crescent-shaped bones found in the lower belly) and appear to articulate with the lateral (outer) gastralia elements. In life, these patagials are thought to have been embedded in a membrane, which connected them, forming a foldable wing. This differs from the situation in living gliding lizards, and the fossil gliding reptiles Xianglong, Mecistotrachelos and kuehneosaurids, where elongated ribs instead fulfill this role. These wings had a wingspan of around 35 centimetres (14 in) in Coelurosauravus.

== Paleobiology ==
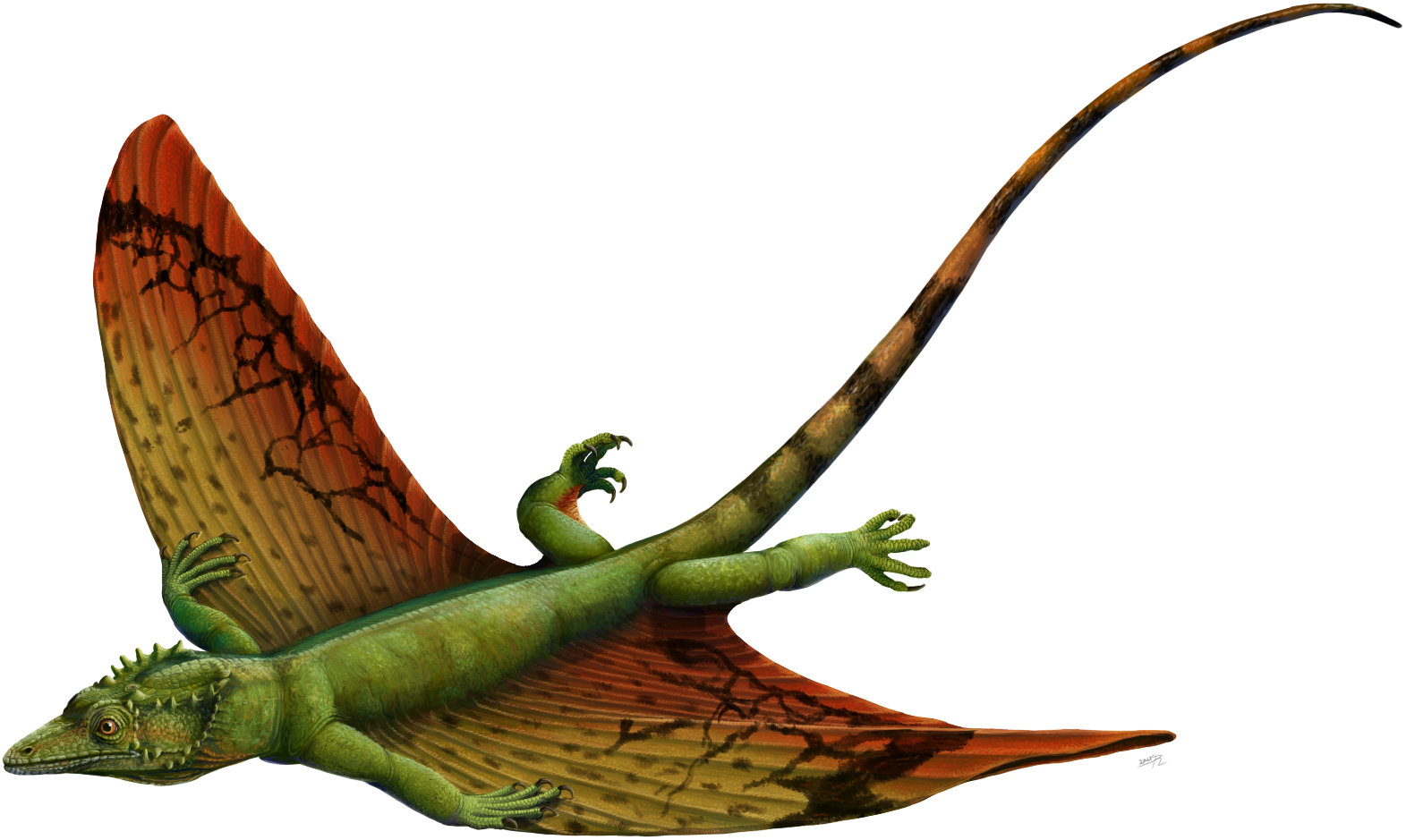
Life restoration of Weigeltisaurus jaekeli

Weigeltisaurids have been suggested to be arboreal (tree-dwelling) insectivores. Their limb morphology was well adapted for grasping tree bark, including vertical tree trunks. Due to their limb morphology, they were highly adapted for movement in the trees, and would likely have not been capable of moving quickly or efficiently on the ground. The cranial ornamentation may have served a display purpose.

=== Gliding ===
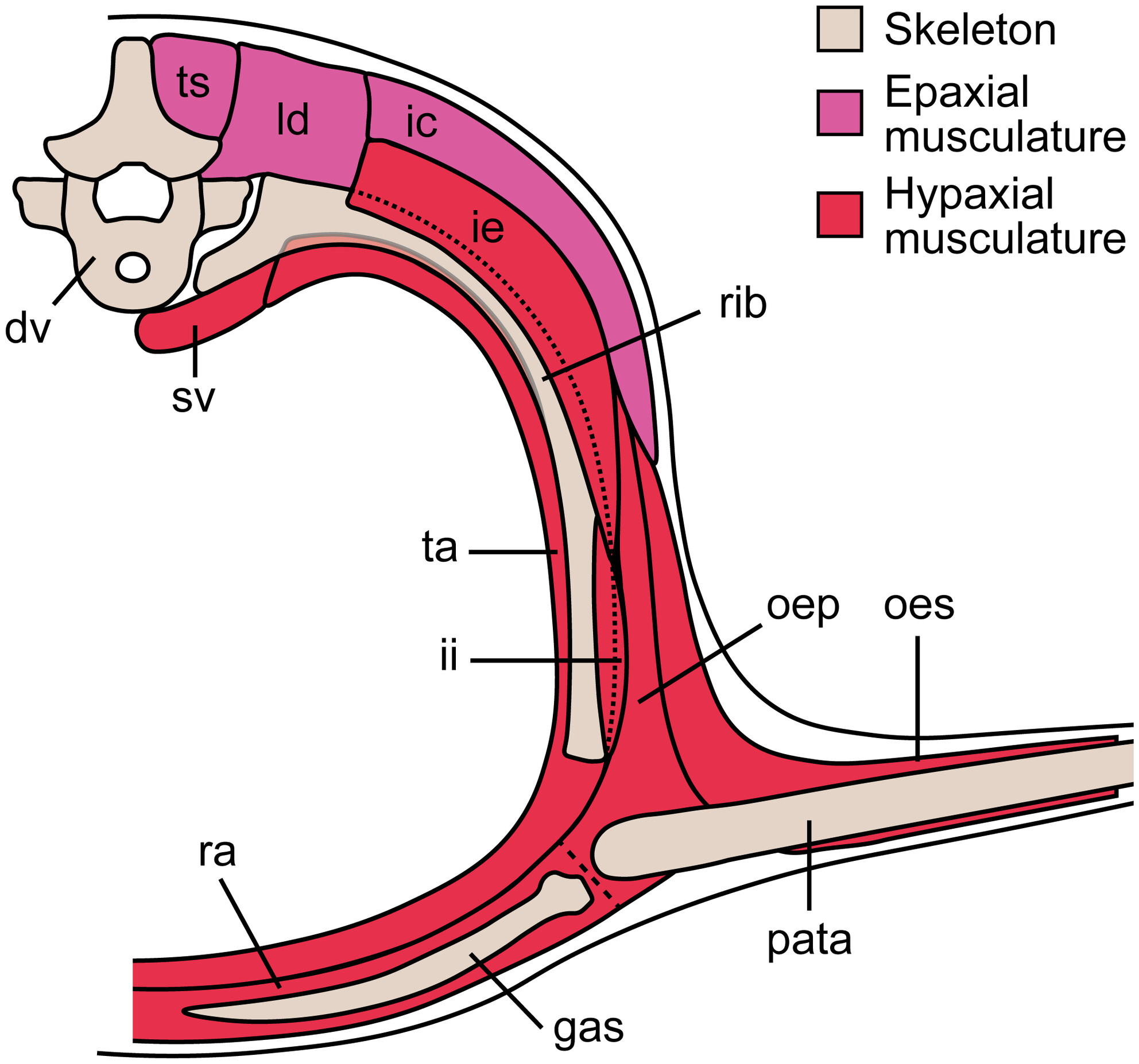
Trunk cross section diagram of a weigeltisaurid, showing articulation of the patagial bones (pata) embedded within the M. obliquus externus (oes) with the gastralia (gas)

The gliding membrane of weigeltisaurids originated lower-lateral surface of the body unlike those of rib-gliding reptiles. The furling and unfurling of the gliding membrane were likely controlled by the abdominal muscles, probably the M. obliquus externus. The patagial bones may have been connected to each other by tendons and muscles, which may have made them naturally tend towards a folded state. The patagial bones had a dumbbell-shaped cross section, which enhanced their rigidity enough to be able to be opened into a wing during flight without collapsing, though the outer tips of the patagial bones appear to have been somewhat flexible. Due to the low-wing configuration, it is likely that the gliding surface was angled upwards to increase stability. In living gliding lizards, it has been found that the forelimbs grab hold of the membrane during takeoff, allowing them to adjust their trajectory mid-flight. Similar behaviour has been proposed for weigeltisaurids, which is supported the presence of an additional phalange in the fourth digit of the hands of weigeltisaurids, which would have allowed them to more effectively grasp the wing. In a 2011 study comparing Coelurosauravus and other extinct gliding reptiles to modern Draco species, Coelurosauravus was found to be a less efficient glider than modern Draco due to its larger body size, with a substantial drop in height per glide, though a later 2025 study found that the body mass of Coelurosauravus had been overestimated and that it would have been a relatively efficient glider.

== Taxonomy ==
=== Species ===
- Coelurosauravus elivensis – Lower Sakamena Formation, Madagascar
- Weigeltisaurus jaekeli – Kupferschiefer, Germany, Marl Slate, England
- Rautiania alexandri and Rautiania minichi – Kul'chumovo-A locality, Russia
- Glaurung schneideri – Kupferschiefer, Germany

Wapitisaurus problematicus, known from a fragmentary skull from the Early Triassic of North America, was initially suggested to be a member of this family. A study published in 2023 reinterpreted it as an unrelated thalattosaur instead.

=== Relationships to other reptiles ===
Weigeltisaurids have generally been interpreted as neodiapsids that lie outside of Sauria (the group containing all living diapsids and probably all living reptiles including birds). Their relative position compared to other basal diapsid groups like the Younginiformes has varied between studies. It has been controversially proposed that they are closely related to the drepanosaurs, a group of arboreal diapsids native to northern Pangaea during the Late Triassic. The proposed clade containing the two groups was named Avicephala by Senter in 2004. Proposed synapomorphies of the clade include "absence of intercentra in cervical region; absence of intercentra in dorsal region; scapulocoracoid, ratio of anteroposterior length at base of scapular blade to dorsoventral height of scapular blade between 0.4 and 0.25; outer process of fifth metatarsal absent." Other studies have recovered the two groups as unrelated, suggesting that drepanosaurs are archosauromorphs instead.

Jenkins et al. (2025) recovered weigeltisaurids as basal neodiapsids, diverging after the 'younginiform' clades Younginidae and Tangasauridae. These results are displayed in the cladogram below:

- Sauropsida
  - †Araeoscelidia
  - - †Bolosauridae
    - Neoreptilia
      - †Ankyramorpha
        - †Acleistorhinidae
        - - †Pareiasauromorpha
          - †Procolophonoidea
      - - †Mesosauridae
        - - - †Cabarzia
            - - †Ascendonanus
              - †Orovenator
          - Parapleurota
            - †Millerettidae
            - Neodiapsida
              - †Younginidae
              - - †Tangasauridae
                - - †Weigeltisauridae
                  - - †Claudiosaurus
                    - Sauria
                      - Lepidosauromorpha
                      - Archosauromorpha
