= Praeornis =

Praeornis Temporal range: Late Jurassic, 154 Ma
- Holotype seen from three angles

Scientific classification
- Kingdom: Animalia
- Phylum: Chordata
- Class: Reptilia
- Clade: Dinosauria
- Clade: Saurischia
- Clade: Theropoda
- Clade: Avialae
- Clade: †Enantiornithes
- Family: †Praeornithidae; Rautian, 1978
- Genus: †Praeornis; Rautian, 1978
- Species: †P. sharovi

Binomial name
- †Praeornis sharovi Rautian, 1978

Extinct genus of dinosaurs

Praeornis is an extinct genus of early avialan, possibly an enantiornithine, from the Late Jurassic Karabastau Formation of Kazakhstan. Only the type species is known, which is P. sharovi.

== Discovery and naming ==
=== Specimens ===
The holotype, specimen PIN 2585/32 (a single feather from the Karabastau Formation, Aulie, Kazakhstan), was discovered and described in 1971 by Aleksandr Grigorevich Sharov. The specimen was then named as Praeornis sharovi by Rautian (1978).

A second specimen, ZPAL V 32/967, another isolated feather from the Karabatsau Formation, was discovered by Dzik et al. in 2006 and was described by Dzik et al. (2010).

=== Identity of the specimens ===
Rautian (1978) initially suggested Praeornis was a bird more primitive than Archaeopteryx, however, Bock (1986) argued that the "feather" was in fact the leaf of a cycad, with Doludenko et al. (1990) agreed with this assessment, noting that it was similar to the leaves of the cycad species Paracycas harrisii. Nessov (1992) instead synonymized Praeornis sharovi with the species Cycadites saportae.

Despite this, several different authors have suggested that the holotype did belong to an animal. Glazunova et al. (1991) examined the specimen using an electron microscope and found that the microstructure had features in common with the "primitive" feathers of ratite birds [since ratites are now known to be secondarily flightless paleognathous birds, their feathers are not primitive but degenerate flight and contour feathers]. Kurochkin (2001) and Dzik et al. (2010) also agreed with this assessment; Dzik et al. (2010) conducted a biochemical analysis of a Praeornis feather and other fossils from the Karabastau Formation, including plants and fish. The analysis showed that the chemical markers of the Praeornis fossil was more similar to the fish scales than to the plant leaves, supporting the hypothesis that the feathers were animal in origin.

Agnolin et al. (2017) suggested that Praeornis was a member of the Enantiornithes after the holotype was compared to a similar feather from the Early Cretaceous of Brazil. The enantiornith found in Brazil was shown to have a pair of rachis-dominated tail feathers very similar to the type specimen of Praeornis, making it likely that Praeornis represents an enantiornith or similar species. If Praeornis was an enantiornith, it would be the oldest known member of the clade, and the only known member from the Late Jurassic.

== Description ==
The feathers of Praeornis likely represent modified tail feathers used for display or balance, similar to those found in some other early avialans. The feathers of Praeornis are unique as a result of their extremely thick central quill (rachis) and stiffened barbs.

== Classification ==
Rautian (1978) initially assigned Praeornis to its own subclass (Praeornithes), order (Praeornithiformes) and family (Praeornithidae). Several authors then considered the holotype to belong to the leaf of a cycad, with more recent authors suggesting Praeornis belonged to Enantiornithes. The family Praeornithidae is also currently accepted as valid, making it a monotypic family containing only the genus Praeornis.
