= Glaurung (reptile) =

Glaurung Temporal range: Lopingian

Scientific classification
- Domain: Eukaryota
- Kingdom: Animalia
- Phylum: Chordata
- Class: Reptilia
- Family: †Weigeltisauridae
- Genus: †Glaurung; Bulanov & Sennikov, 2015

Type species
- †Glaurung schneideri Bulanov & Sennikov, 2015

Extinct species of reptile

Glaurung is an extinct genus of weigeltisaurid reptile from the Upper Permian of Germany. The only known species is Glaurung schneideri. Originally considered a specimen of Coelurosauravus, a later study named it as a new genus after noting that it had several unique characteristics relative to other weigeltisaurids. These characteristics included a low skull, small eyes, smooth parietal and squamosal bones, and spiny jugal bones.

== Discovery ==
Glaurung schneideri is known from a slab and counterslab discovered in 2002 by fossil collector Thomas Schneider. It was found in Late Permian Kupferschiefer sediments near Mansfeld, Germany. Although the original specimen remains in Schneider's private collection, there are several casts in European museums, such as MBR 3610 (stored at the Museum fur Naturkunde in Berlin) and PIN 5392/1 (stored at the Paleontological Institute in Moscow). The specimen consists of a flattened skull as well as material from the pectoral girdle, forelimbs, vertebrae, and gliding structures (termed "patagial spurs"). Although it was originally referred to Coelurosauravus by Schaumberg, Unwin, & Brandt (2007), it was later given its own genus and species by Bulanov & Sennikov (2015). The genus is named after Glaurung, the fictional ancestor of all dragons in J.R.R. Tolkien's Middle Earth legendarium. The specific name honors Thomas Schneider.

== Description ==
Like other weigeltisaurids, Glaurung possessed bony extensions on the side of the body which probably supported a patagial membrane, allowing it to glide. In addition, bones at the rear of the skull formed a distinctive crest similar to that of other members of the family. Most of its distinguishing qualities (compared to other members of the family) relate to the structure of this crest.

The crest manifested as two large, rectangular horns which projected straight back. These horns were extensions of the parietal bones, known as caudal processes. The parietal bones also formed the part of the skull between the base of the horns and above the braincase. The caudal processes were long and quite wide, with each horn almost as wide as the distance between them. Apart from small ridges and bumps along their anterolateral (front and outer) edge, the horns were rather unornamented, without the large spines present on the parietals of other weigeltisaurids. The caudal process of each parietal defined the upper edge of a large hole in the skull known as the temporal fenestra, while the rear edge of this hole was formed by the squamosal bone. Like the parietals' caudal processes, the squamosals were similarly widened and relatively unornamented. On the other hand, the jugal (cheek bone) had large, conical spines with rounded tips. Although a lack of spines on the parietals and squamosals may indicate that the Glaurung specimens were juveniles, the well-developed jugal spines indicates that a more likely explanation is that they were legitimate distinguishing features of adult members of the genus.

The orbits (eye sockets) were relatively small. The postorbital bone, which formed the upper rear edge of each orbit, also had a rear branch which underscored a portion of the parietal horns and formed part of the upper edge of the temporal fenestra. The teeth were fewer in number compared to other weigeltisaurids, and the teeth towards the rear part of the mouth were flattened near their tips. Based on the small size of the orbits, their elevated position relative to the rest of the skull), and the wideness of the squamosals, it is likely that Glaurung had a lower, broader skull than other known weigeltisaurids. Bulanov & Sennikov (2015) considered Glaurung to be so distinctive (compared to other weigeltisaurids) that they placed it in its own subfamily, Glaurunginae.

== Paleoenvironment ==
The Kupferschiefer is a marine unit that forms part of the Zechstein, a sequence of rocks formed on the edge of the Zechstein Sea, a large inland shallow sea that existed in Northern Europe during the Late Permian. The environment at the time of deposition is considered to have been semi-arid. The terrestrial flora of the Zechstein is dominated by conifers, with seed ferns also being common, while taeniopterids, ginkgophytes and sphenophytes are rare. Other terrestrial vertebrates found in the Kupfershiefer and lower Zechstein include the fellow weigeltisaurid Weigeltisaurus, the early archosauromorph Protorosaurus, the pareiasaur Parasaurus, the cynodont Procynosuchus, and indeterminate captorhinids, dicynodonts, and dissorophid temnospondyls.
