= Rautiania =

Rautiania Temporal range: Late Permian

Scientific classification
- Kingdom: Animalia
- Phylum: Chordata
- Class: Reptilia
- Family: †Weigeltisauridae
- Genus: †Rautiania; Bulanov & Sennikov, 2006

Type species
- †Rautiania alexandri Bulanov & Sennikov, 2006

Species
- †R. alexandri Bulanov & Sennikov, 2006 (type); †R. minichi Bulanov & Sennikov, 2006

Extinct genus of reptiles

Rautiania is an extinct genus of gliding neodiapsid reptiles belonging to the family Weigeltisauridae. Isolated fossil remains of Rautiania are known from the Late Permian of Russia. The genus is known from two species, Rautiania alexandri (the type species) and Rautiania minichi, which differ in aspects of their maxilla and parietal bones. Certain Rautiania fossils have helped to reveal certain aspects of weigeltisaurid anatomy and lifestyle which had long alluded paleontologists, such as the component bones of the "crest" at the back of the head, and the large amount of adaptations towards life in the canopies of forests.

== Discovery ==
Rautiania fossils were first discovered during a 2005 paleontological expedition into the Orenburg Oblast of Russia. Numerous isolated bones from reptiles of the family Weigeltisauridae were found at the Kul'chumovo-A site. Some of these bones (namely, maxillae and parietals) showed two different morphotypes. In 2006, Russian Academy of Sciences paleontologists Valeriy V. Bulanov and Andrey G. Sennikov described these weigeltisaurid remains as the new genus Rautiania, named after Russian zoologist Aleksandr Sergeevich Rautian (Александр Сергеевич Раутиан). They named the two different morphotypes as two separate species of Rautiania: R. alexandri and R. minichi. Both of these species had a single parietal bone as their holotype. The type species R. alexandri was also named after Aleksander Rautian, while R. minichi was named after a different Russian paleontologist, Maksim Georgievich Minikh. Additional Rautiania bones (of an unspecified species) from both the skull and the rest of the body were described in 2010, along with the implications these new discoveries provided for weigeltisaurid anatomy in general.

== Description ==
=== Skull ===
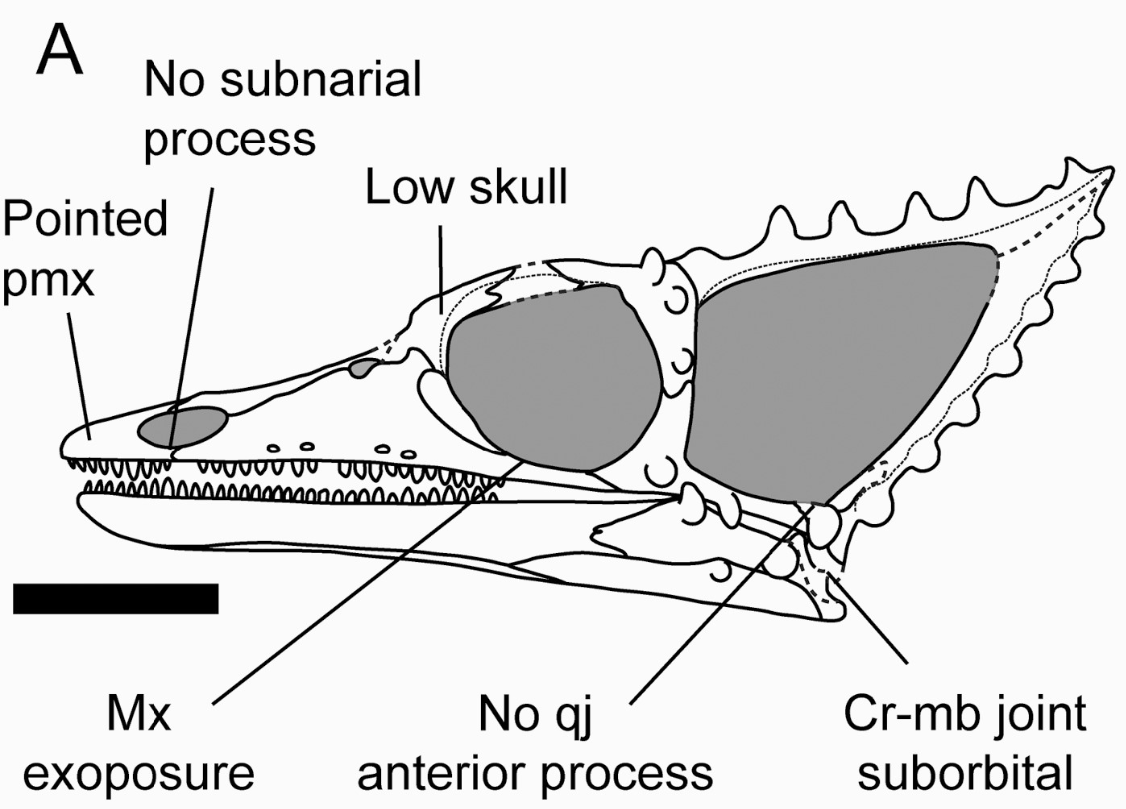
Like the related Weigeltisaurus (figured), the parietal and squamosal bones at the back of the skull have well developed spines

The skull of Rautiania possessed a number of unique characteristics, which assist in distinguishing members of the genus from other weigeltisaurids, as well as each Rautiania species (Rautiania alexandri and Rautiania minichi) from each other. The premaxilla (a toothed bone at the tip of the snout) was long and narrow, with 11 to 13 teeth (More than twice as many as in Weigeltisaurus jaekeli). The maxilla (a toothed bone at the side of the snout) differed between species. R. alexandri had a maxilla with 30 closely spaced teeth and a ridge under the eye socket. R. minichi, on the other hand, had a maxilla with fewer (23) and more well-spaced teeth and no ridge under the eye socket. Rautiania teeth were unusually flattened from left-to-right and enlarged from front-to-back. In R. alexandri, this is most pronounced at the rear of the maxilla, and in R. minichi it is most pronounced at the middle of the maxilla. Premaxillary teeth were small, conical, slightly recurved, and largest towards the rear of the premaxilla. The surangular (a bone which forms the upper edge of the rear part of the mandible) had two spikes on its outer surface and a large area for muscle attachment on its inner surface.

Rautiania bones have helped to clarify certain aspects of weigeltisaurid skull anatomy, particularly relating to bones at the rear part of the cranium. As with other weigeltisaurids, the rear part of the skull of Rautiania had a large hole (known as a temporal fenestra) on each side, edged by bones ornamented with spines, thus forming a sort of "crest". The rear lower corner of the temporal fenestra is now known to have been formed by the quadratojugal bone, since a three-dimensionally preserved quadratojugal has been discovered in Rautiania. It was small, possessing a single large spike and firmly connecting to the quadrate bone of the jaw joint. The discovery of a quadratojugal in weigeltisaurids reveals that the bone which formed the rear edge of the temporal fenestra was the squamosal bone. The squamosal of Rautiania was tall and slightly slanted backwards; it was fringed with large spines oriented outwards, as is typical for weigeltisaurids. The upper edge of the temporal fenestra is formed by the parietal bone, which differs in structure between Rautiania species. In R. alexandri, the parietal possesses a row of thin, blocky structures which conjoin at their base. R. minichi, on the other hand, has a row of large, widely spaced spines on its parietal. The upper portion of the postfrontal bone is wider in Rautiania than in other weigeltisaurids.

=== Postcranial skeleton ===
Bulanov & Sennikov (2010) described several noteworthy areas of Rautiania's skeleton, namely the sacrum (hip vertebrae), humerus (upper arm bone), and manus (hand). The sacrum was formed by three vertebrae, while other weigeltisaurids have (perhaps erroneously) been reported as having two, as in other reptiles. Based on its morphology, the first sacral vertebrae was probably not part of the sacrum ancestrally. The sacrum connects to each ilium (upper plate of the hip) by means of three sacral ribs, one on each side of each vertebra. The second and third sacral ribs were massive, fused to their respective vertebrae and flattened into fan-shaped structures. The first sacral ribs slightly bends backwards, the second extends straight out, and the third slightly bends forwards.

The humerus was long, curved, and strongly twisted along its longitudinal axis. Despite the lightly-built structure of the bone, the knobs, ridges, and pits which made up its joints were well-developed. Overall, it closely resembled the humerus of araeoscelidian reptiles such as Petrolacosaurus and Araeoscelis. The hand had five digits, with elongated phalanges (finger bones). The phalangeal formula (number of phalanges in each finger) was 2-3-4-5-4, meaning that the fifth finger had one more joint than that of generalized reptiles (which have a phalangeal formula of 2-3-4-5-3). The phalanges also increase in length towards the tip of the fingers, where they abut large, strongly curved unguals (claws).

== Paleobiology ==
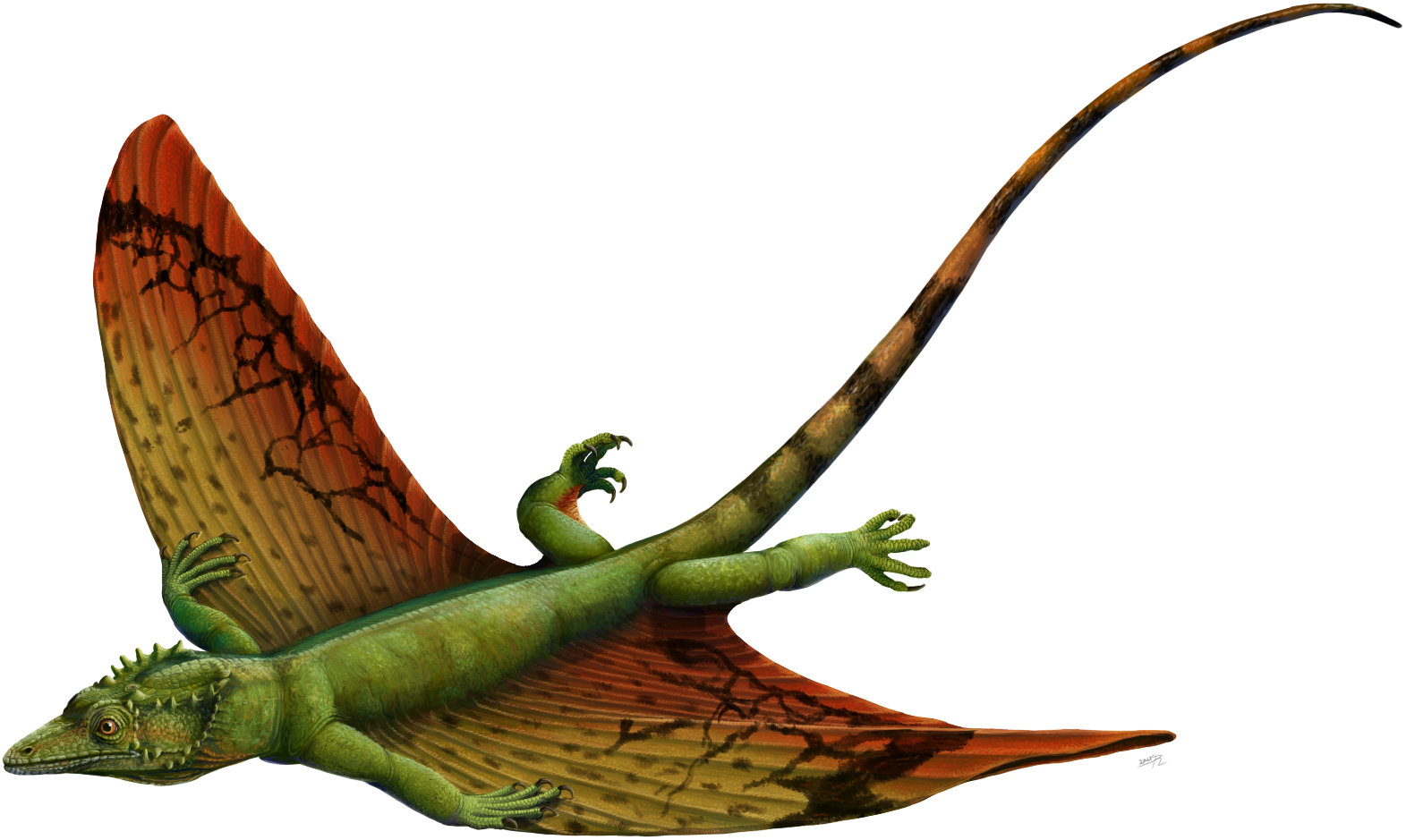
Life restoration of the related Weigeltisaurus in gliding posture

Like other weigeltisaurids, Rautiania individuals were likely able to glide on skin stretched between bony rods which attached to the torso. Although no Rautiania specimen preserves these rods, several fossils from this genus do have weight-saving features, as well as adaptations to arboreal life. For example, the squamosal bone had an internal structure with open canals and air pockets, making the large crest quite light for its size. The presence of three sacral vertebrae (rather than two as in most reptiles) likely helped the hip absorb the shock of landing on trees after gliding. The lightly-built but strong humerus would have given the animal both better aerial abilities and more flexible climbing abilities. The hand proportions are very similar to those of modern climbing lizards and mammals, further supporting the argument that Rautiania and other weigeltisaurids were well-adapted for arboreal life. Gliding was likely an adaptation to ease movement between sparse treetops in the upper canopy of forests.
