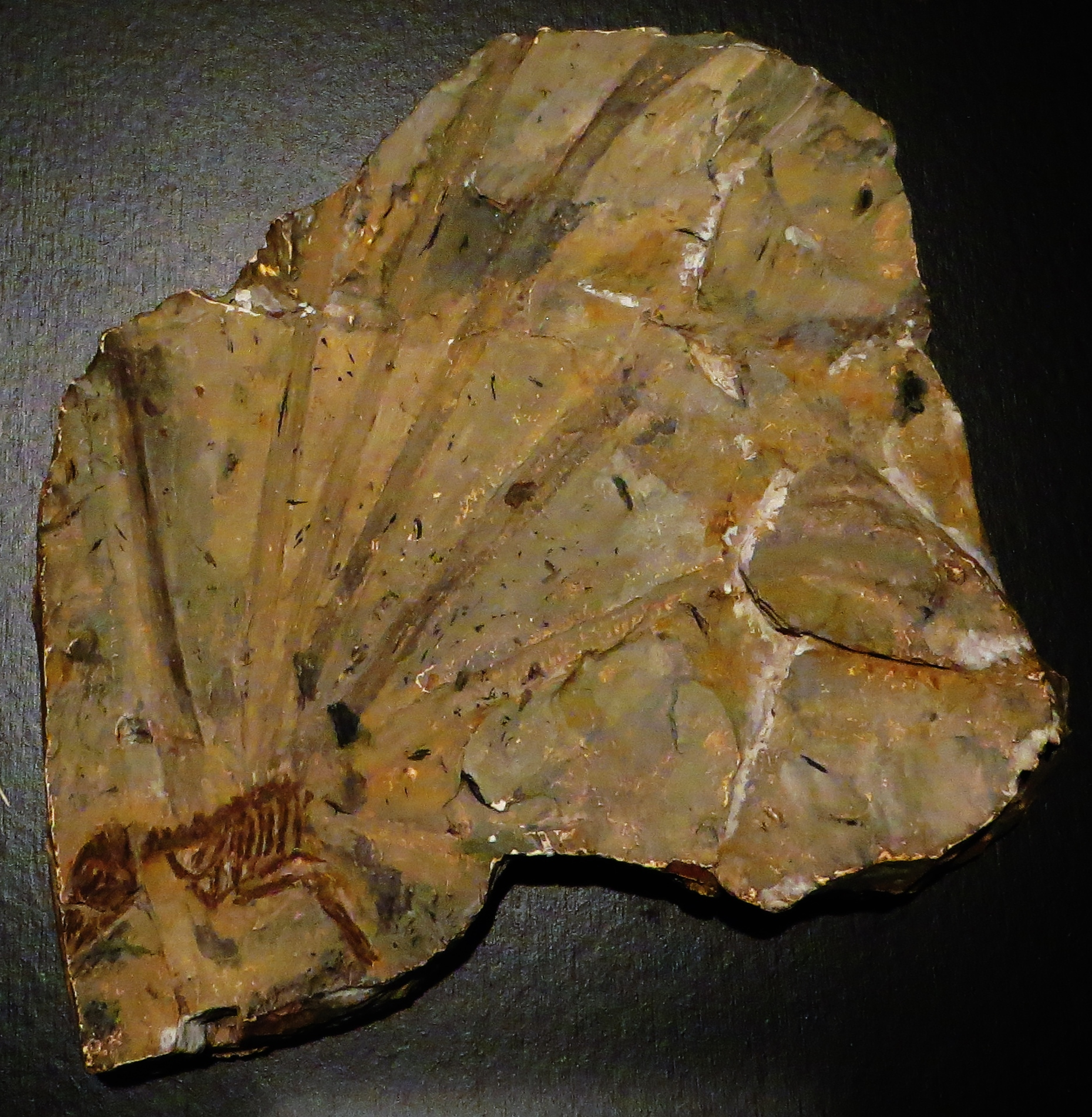
- Cast of the type specimen

Scientific classification
- Kingdom: Animalia
- Phylum: Chordata
- Class: Reptilia
- Clade: †Drepanosauromorpha
- Genus: †Longisquama; Sharov, 1970
- Species: †L. insignis

Binomial name
- †Longisquama insignis Sharov, 1970

= Longisquama =

Longisquama Temporal range: Middle or Late Triassic, 235 Ma

Extinct genus of reptiles

Longisquama is a genus of extinct reptile containing only one species, L. insignis, known from a poorly preserved skeleton and several incomplete fossil impressions from the Middle to Late Triassic Madygen Formation of Kyrgyzstan. The generic name means "long scales", and the specific name insignis means "unusual", in Latin. The holotype skeleton is notable for a number of long, superficially feather-like structures growing from its back, now thought to represent a single row growing upwards from the midline. The affinities of Longisquama among reptiles have long been contentious, with some researchers controversially connecting Longisquama and its back structures to the origin of birds and feathers, a view which is largely rejected. In 2025, a close relative, Mirasaura was described from France, which shares the feather-like back structures. Phylogenetic analysis of Mirasaura suggests that it and by extension Longisquama belong to Drepanosauromorpha. It is now suggested that the back structures served for display.

== History ==
The holotype specimen, PIN 2584/4, was discovered by A.G. Sharov while he was searching for Triassic insect fossils in the Leylek District in Kyrgyzstan. The specimen was recovered from rocks of the Madygen Formation, at the Djailaucho locality. Four other specimens, each preserving 1-6 "long scales" in isolation, were designated as paratypes. These specimens are all in the collection of the Paleontological Institute of the Russian Academy of Sciences in Moscow. Three additional isolated integumentary structures, in the collections of the Geological Institute of the Freiberg University of Mining and Technology, were recovered from the locality in 2007.

=== Interpretation ===
Researchers Haubold and Buffetaut believed that the structures were long, modified scales attached in pairs to the lateral walls of the body, like paired gliding membranes. They published a reconstruction of Longisquama with plumes in a pattern akin to gliding lizards like Draco species and Kuehneosaurus latus, allowing it to glide, or at least parachute. Though the reconstruction is now thought to have been inaccurate, it has nevertheless persisted in paleoart of Longisquama.

Other researchers place the scales differently. Unwin and Benton interpreted them as a single, unpaired row of modified scales that run along the dorsal midline. Jones et al. interpreted them as two paired rows of structures that are anatomically very much like feathers, and which are in positions like those of birds' spinal feather tracts. Feather-development expert Richard Prum (and also Reisz and Sues) see the structures as anatomically very different from feathers, and thinks they are elongate, ribbonlike scales.

Still other observers (e.g. Fraser in 2006) believe that the structures are not part of Longisquama at all, that they are simply plant fronds that were preserved along with the reptile and were misinterpreted. Buchwitz & Voigt (2012) argue that the structures of Longisquama are not plant remains, because all of the structures except for the last in the holotype PIN 2584/4 are arranged regularly, and that they are not preserved as carbon films, the usual mode of preservation for plants in the Madygen Formation. The plant from Madygen with greatest similarity to the Longisquama structures is Mesenteriophyllum kotschnevii, but its leaves do not have the distinct hockey stick shape of the structures attributed to Longisquama. The discovery of Mirasaura, a closely related diapsid genus with similar structures preserved in articulation, demonstrates that these structures were indeed integumentary.

== Description ==
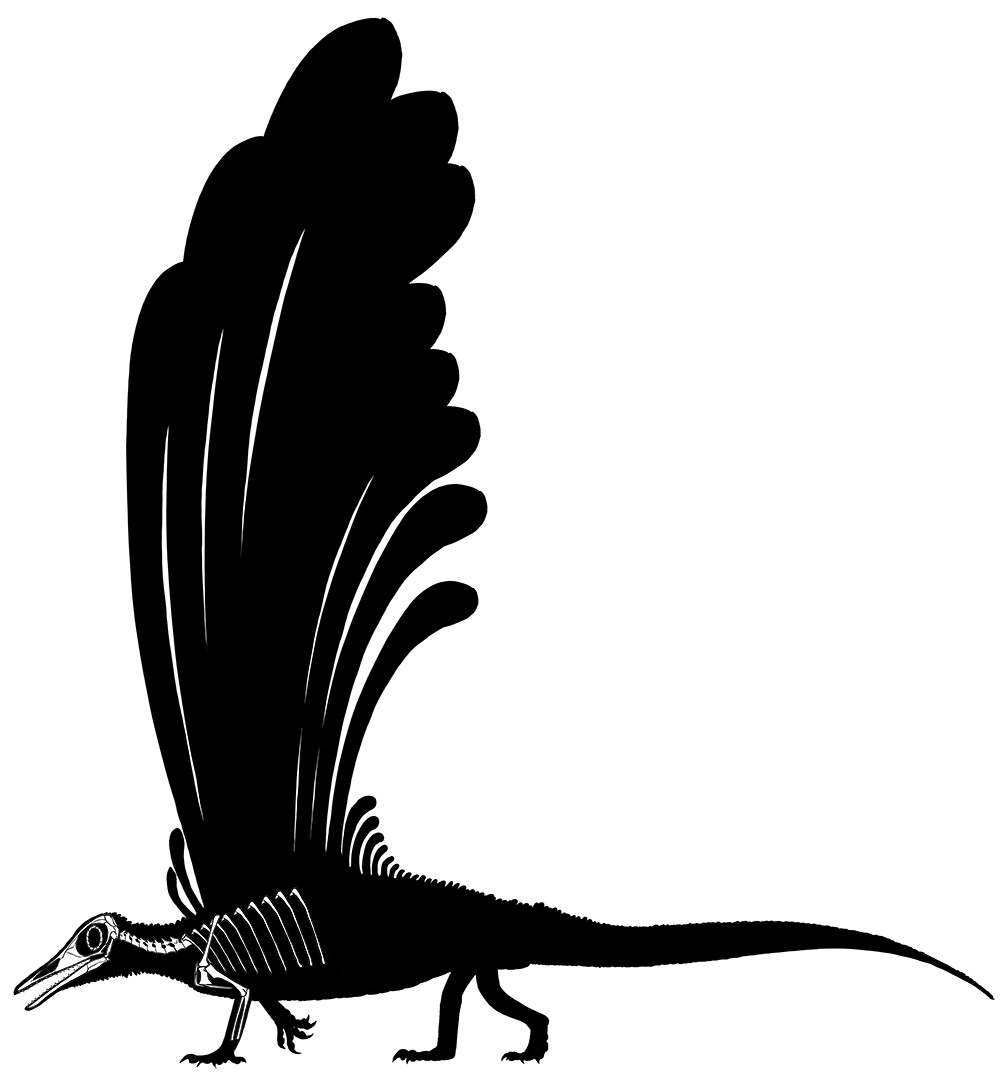
Modern reconstruction of the skeleton including the long integumentary appendages, informed by its close relative Mirasaura

Estimated size of the Longisquama holotype and two individuals of Mirasaura compared to a human hand

Longisquama was a small reptile, estimated to have a body about 50 millimetres (2.0 in) long. The skull of Longisquama has the superficially bird-like appearance typical of drepanosaurs, with a tapering snout and domed skull roof. Teeth are present closer to the snout tip than in its close relative Mirasaura. The neck is composed of no more than seven cervical vertebrae, which lack cervical ribs. Longisquama lacks the distinctly humped back seen in Mirasaura and some other drepanosaurs, and it also lacks an olecranon process on the ulna. Longisquama possesses a U-shaped bone that has been interpreted as a furcula, but it differs in shape from the fused clavicles seen in other drepanosaurs, making its identification uncertain.

=== Integumentary structures ===
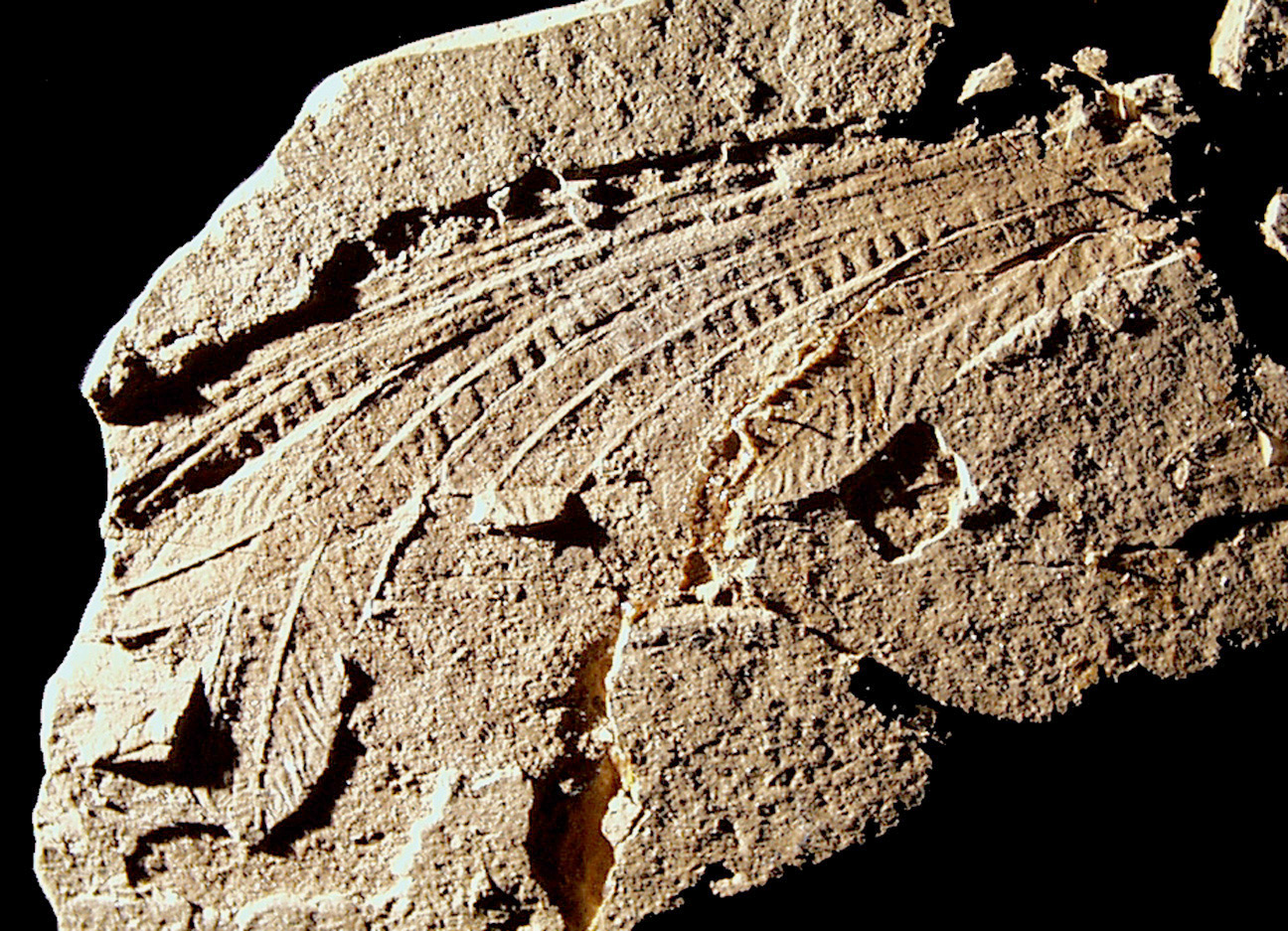
Isolated back structures of paratype specimen PIN 2584/9

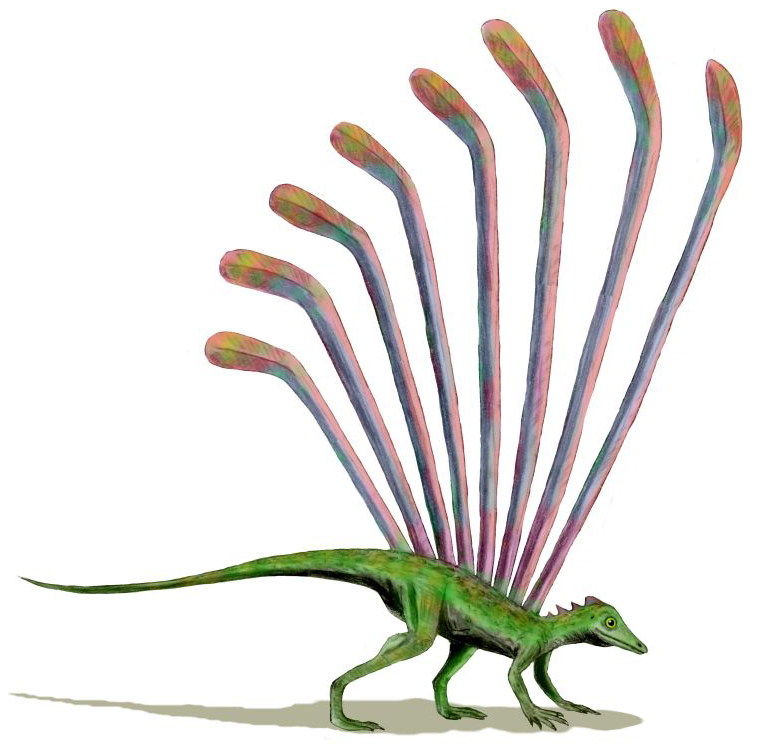
Restoration from 2007

Longisquama is characterized by distinctive integumentary structures, extending in a single row along the midline of its back. The holotype (specimen PIN 2584/4) is the only known fossil preserving these appendages projecting from the back of an associated skeleton. It has seven appendages radiating in a fan-like pattern, but the tips are not preserved. PIN 2584/9 preserves five complete appendages spaced close together. PIN 2584/6 preserves two long, curved appendage running side by side. Other specimens, such as PIN 2585/7 and FG 596/V/1, preserve only one appendage. These structures are long and narrow throughout most of their lengths, and angle backward near the tip to give the appearance of a hockey stick. The proximal straight section is divided into three longitudinal lobes: a smooth lobe on either side and a transversely ridged lobe running between them. The middle ridged lobe is made up of raised "rugae" and deep "interstices", which Sharov compared to rosary beads. The distal section is thought to be an extension of the middle and anterior lobes of the proximal section. While the anterior lobe widens in the distal section, the posterior lobe of the proximal section narrows until it ends at the base of the distal section. In addition, an "anterior flange" appears about two-thirds the way up the proximal section and continues to the tip of the distal section. Both lobes in the distal section are ridged and separated by a grooved axis. In some specimens, the rugae of either lobe in the distal section line up with each other, while in other specimens they do not. Some specimens have straight rugae projecting perpendicular to the axis, while others have rugae that curve in an S-shape. One specimen of Longisquama, PIN 2584/5, has small spines projecting from the axis of the distal section.

The holotype skeleton shows each structure attaching to a vertebral spine. These anchorage points are visible as raised knobs. The base of each appendage is slightly convex, unlike the flattened shape of the rest of the structure. The convex shape may be evidence that the base of each structure was tubular in life, anchoring like other integumentary structures such as mammalian hair or avian feathers into a follicle. Moreover, the proximity of each structure to its corresponding vertebra suggests that a thick layer of soft tissue, possibly including a follicle, surrounded each base. While the structures have been suggested to be mobile, being able to fold back against the body, fossils of the closely related Mirasaura show no sign of the musculature required to do this.

== Classification ==
Like the 'long scales', the skeletal features of Longisquama are equally difficult to diagnose. As a result, Longisquama has been related by scientists to many different sauropsid groups.

Sharov classified Longisquama in a monotypic family, Longisquamidae, and determined that it was a "pseudosuchian" (a "primitive" archosaur, but as an archosaur a relatively derived reptile) on the basis of two features: a mandibular fenestra and an antorbital fenestra. Subsequently, Longisquama was classified as an indeterminate "thecodontian", an early dinosaur, and an archosaur with affinities to early birds.

Unwin and Benton did not think it was possible to diagnose the crucial fenestrae; the holes could simply be damage to the fossil. They agreed with Sharov that Longisquama has acrodont teeth and an interclavicle, but instead of a furcula, they saw paired clavicles. These features would be more typical of a member of Lepidosauromorpha, meaning that Longisquama would not be an archosaur and thus not closely related to birds. According to a cladistic study by Phil Senter in 2004, Longisquama would be an even more basal diapsid and a member of Avicephala, more closely related to Coelurosauravus.

A 2012 re-examination of the fossil found that the presence of fenestrae in the skull crucial to classification as an archosaur could not be confirmed; in fact, a section of the skull in one of the fossil slabs that had previously been used to justify the presence of antorbital fenestrae does not contain any actual bone. This study concluded that none of the proposed classifications of Longisquama could be confirmed or refuted using the available evidence. The authors of the study tentatively placed Longisquama among the Archosauromorpha as a result of their hypothesis of developmental "deep homology" between its plumes, bird feathers, crocodile scales and pterosaur pycnofibres.

In 2025, a closely related diapsid with similar integumentary structures, Mirasaura, was described. A phylogenetic analysis including the two taxa found them to form a clade within Drepanosauromorpha. The position of Drepanosauromorpha, in turn, was unresolved at the base of Neodiapsida.

- Drepanosauromorpha
  - Hypuronector
  - - - Longisquama
      - Mirasaura
    - - Vallesaurus
      - Drepanosauridae
        - Dolabrosaurus
        - Megalancosaurus
        - - Avicranium
          - Drepanosaurus

=== Debate over bird origins ===
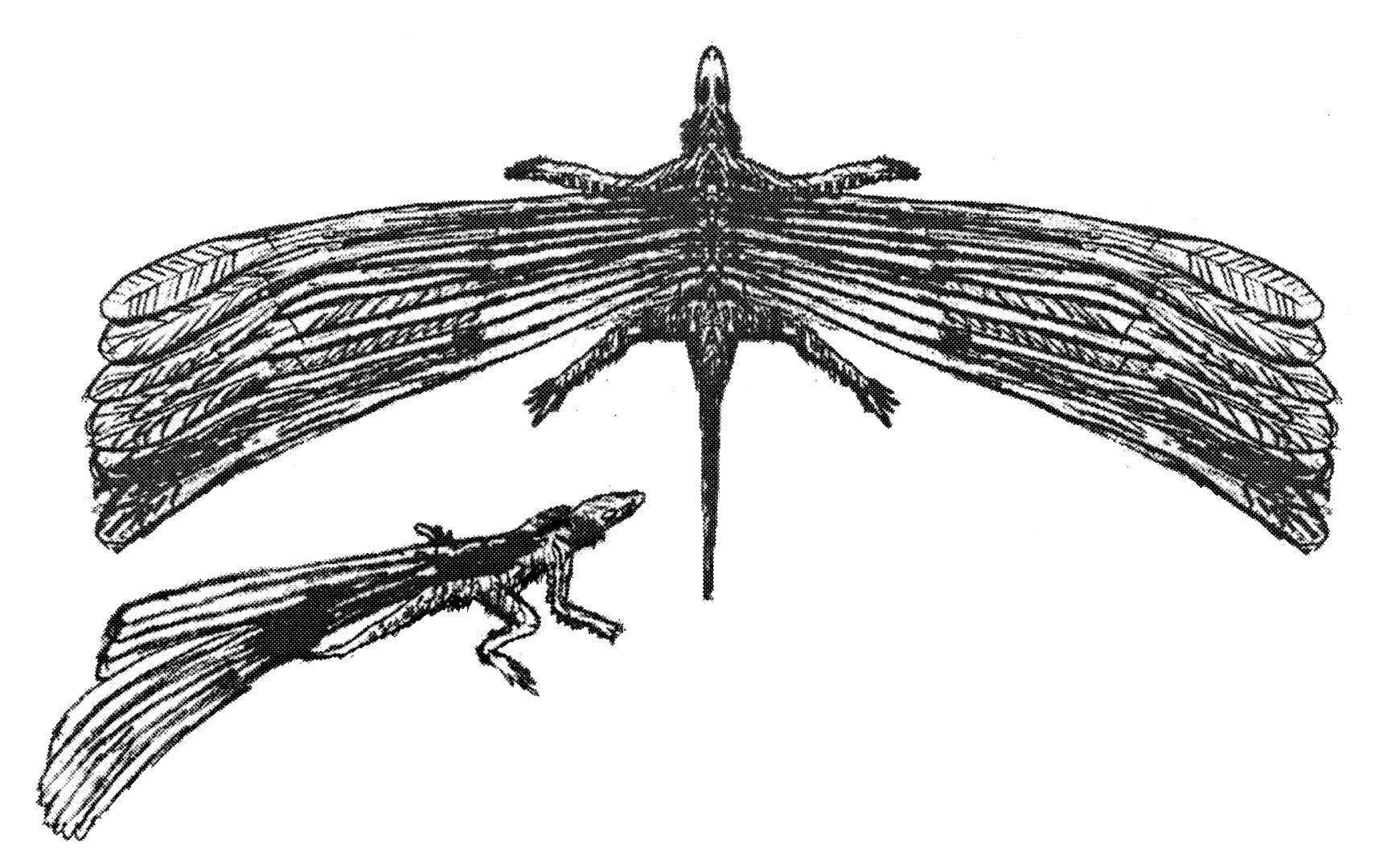
Back structures hypothetically shown in pairs, a view now considered erroneous

The questions relating to the reptilian classification of Longisquama and to the exact function of the 'long scales' relate to a dismissed proposal that birds are not dinosaurs, but rather descend from earlier archosaurs like Longisquama.

=== Background ===
A consensus of paleontologists agrees that birds evolved from, and by modern taxonomic practice, are theropod dinosaurs. The scenario for this hypothesis is that early theropod dinosaurs were endothermic, and evolved simple filamentous feathers for insulation. These feathers later increased in size and complexity and then adapted to aerodynamic uses. Ample evidence for this hypothesis has been found in the fossil record, specifically for such dinosaurs as Kulindadromeus, Sinosauropteryx, Caudipteryx, Microraptor and many others. Longisquama is thus regarded as a diapsid with strange scales, ambiguous skeletal features and no real significance to bird evolution.

An extreme minority of scientists posit the hypothesis that birds evolved from small, arboreal archosaurs like Longisquama. They see these as ectothermic animals that adapted to gliding by developing elongated scales and then pennaceous feathers. This hypothesis, however, is not supported by cladistic analysis.

== Paleobiology ==
The closely related Mirasaura has been suggested to have been a tree-dwelling (arboreal) organism that like other drepanosaurs probably had a prehensile tail and likely fed on insects and other small invertebrates. The single vertical row of back structures of Mirasaura and Longisquama were not effective for gliding, but instead likely served as elaborate display structures.
