= Aleksandr Sergeevich Rautian =

Aleksandr Sergeevich Rautian (born 22 March 1949) is a Russian paleontologist working at the Paleontological Institute of the Russian Academy of Sciences in Moscow, Russia.

He has named several species including Parvicursor remotus and Praeornis sharovi.

== Tributes ==
The gliding neodiapsid reptile genus and species name Rautiania alexandri Bulanov & Sennikov, 2006 is a tribute to Aleksandr Sergeevich Rautian.
