= Marl Slate Formation =

Geologial formation in England

- Stratigraphic range: Lopingian
- Type: Formation
- Underlies: Raisby Formation, Cadeby Formation
- Overlies: Yellow Sands Formation or unconformity with Carboniferous Coal Measures
- Thickness: To 5.48 metres

Lithology
- Primary: Dolomite

Location
- Region: England
- Country: United Kingdom

The Marl Slate Formation is a geological formation in England. Despite its name, it is mostly dolomite rock. The Marl Slate Formation was formed about 273 to 259 million years ago, during the Guadalupian and Lopingian epochs of the late Permian period of the Earth's geological history. This formation is part of the Zechstein Group of rocks, and is equivalent to the Kupferschiefer of Germany. The Marl Slate Formation contains fossils including the conodont Mesogondolella britannica and the dorypterid fishes Dorypterus and Lekanichthys, as well as the gliding reptile Weigeltisaurus and terrestrial reptile Protorosaurus The Marl Slate Formation outcrops in County Durham and Yorkshire in north-east England.

== See also ==
- Geology of Yorkshire
- List of fossiliferous stratigraphic units in England
