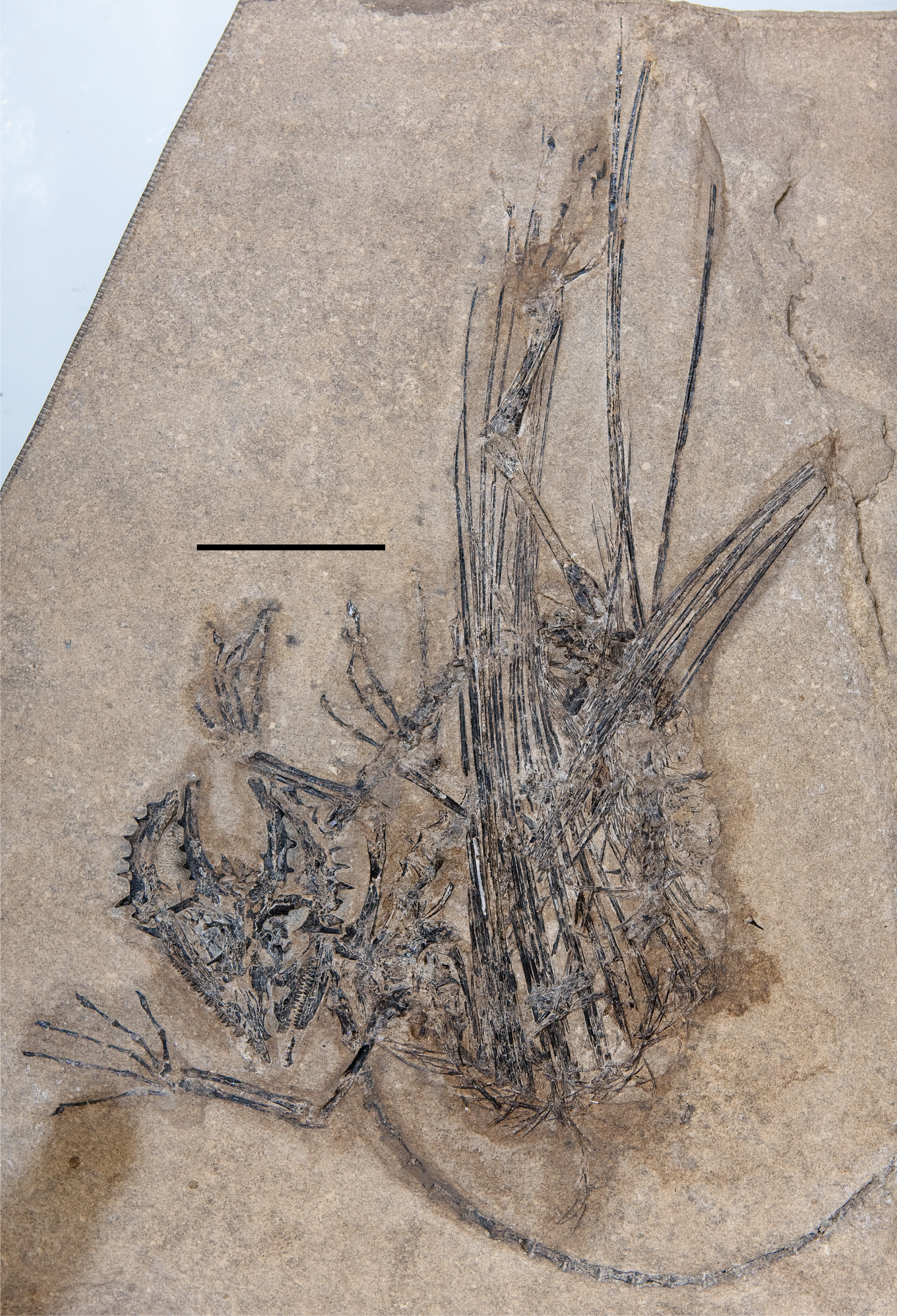
- Specimen SMNK-PAL 2882

Scientific classification
- Kingdom: Animalia
- Phylum: Chordata
- Class: Reptilia
- Family: †Weigeltisauridae
- Genus: †Weigeltisaurus; Kuhn, 1939
- Species: †W. jaekeli

Binomial name
- †Weigeltisaurus jaekeli (Weigelt, 1930)

Synonyms
- Palaeochamaeleo jaekeli Weigelt, 1930; Gracilisaurus ottoi Weigelt, 1930; Coelurosauravus jaekeli – Evans and Haubold, 1987

= Weigeltisaurus =

Weigeltisaurus Temporal range: Lopingian ~259.51–251.9 Ma

Extinct genus of reptiles

Weigeltisaurus is an extinct genus of weigeltisaurid reptile from the Late Permian Kupferschiefer of Germany and Marl Slate of England. It has a single species, originally named as Palaechamaeleo jaekeli in 1930 and later assigned the name Weigeltisaurus jaekeli in 1939, when it was revealed that Palaeochamaeleo was a preoccupied name. A 1987 review by Evans and Haubold later lumped Weigeltisaurus jaekeli under Coelurosauravus as a second species of that genus. A 2015 reassessment of skull morphology study substantiated the validity of Weigeltisaurus and subsequent authors have used this genus. Like other weigeltisaurids, it possessed long rod-like bones that radiated from the trunk that were likely used to support membranes used for gliding, similar to extant Draco lizards.

== History of discovery ==
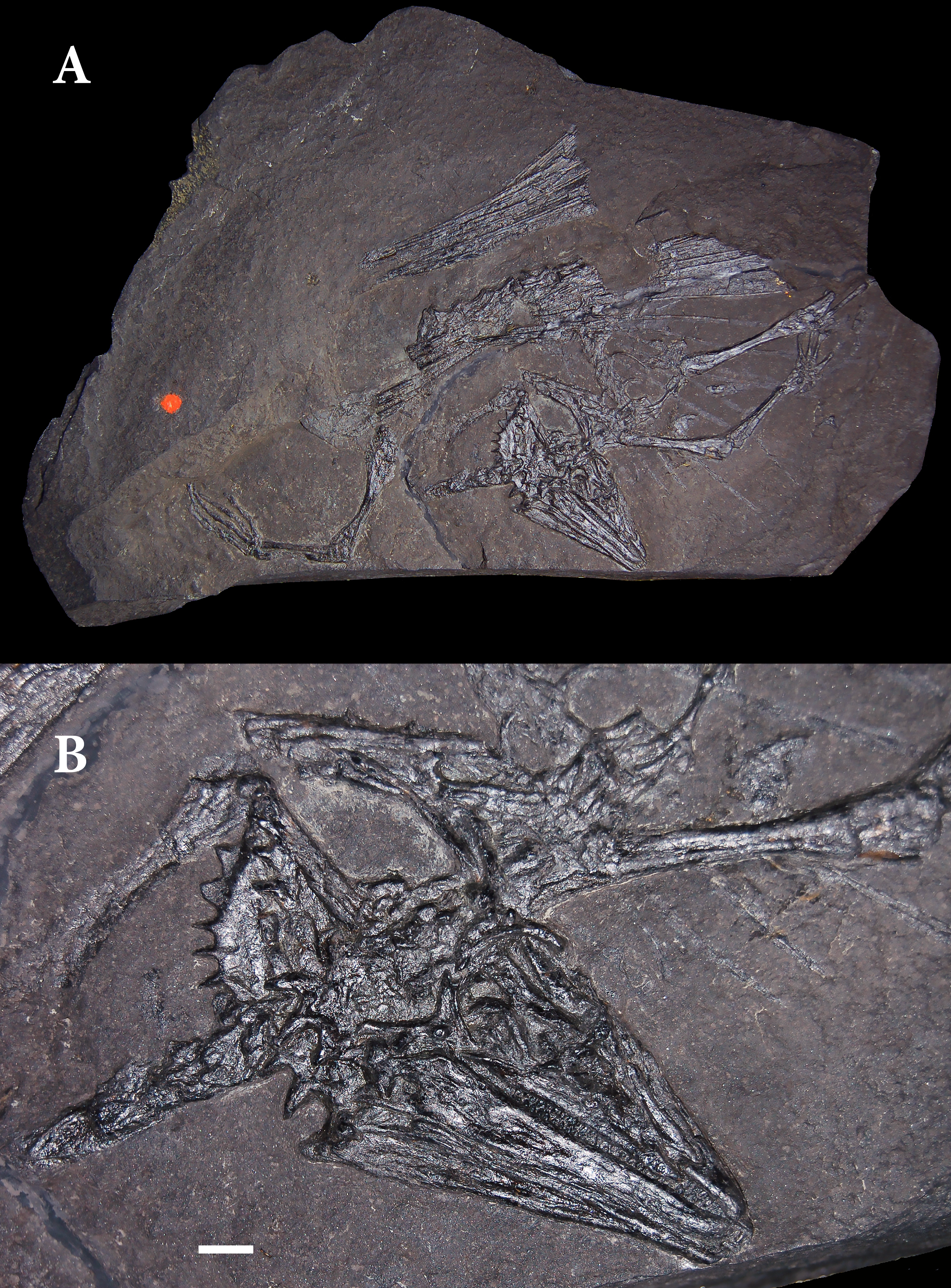
Holotype specimen (SSWG 113/7)

The first remains of Weigeltisaurus jaekeli were described by Johannes Weigelt in 1930 from a specimen (SSWG 113/7) found in the Kupferschiefer near the town of Eisleben in Saxony-Anhalt, Germany. The specimen was purchased from a fossil dealer in 1913 by Otto Jaekel. Jaekel had considered the bony rods to be caudal fin spines of the coelacanth Coelacanthus granulatus that was also known from the Kupferschiefer, and so the rods were prepared away to expose the skeleton. Johannes Weigelt named the new species Palaeochamaeleo jaekeli both in honour of Jaekel and in reference to the similarity of the skull morphology to those of chameleons.

The same year, Friedrich von Huene noted the similarity of the specimen to Coelurosauravus elivensis from Madagascar, which had been described by Jean Piveteau in 1926, and concluded that both animals were closely related and represented climbing reptiles. In 1939, Oskar Kuhn noted that Palaeochamaeleo had already been used in a different publication in 1903, and proposed the new genus name Weigeltisaurus in honour of Weigelt.

In publications in 1976 and 1986, Günther Schaumberg described additional specimens of Weigeltisaurus from the Kupferschiefer of Germany. Due to the fact that the bony rods were also present on these skeletons, and the fact that the rods were only superficially similar to coelacanth spines, Schaumberg (1976) argued that they represented parts of the animals skeleton and were used for gliding flight, stating that the presence of the bones "...virtually provokes the attempt to explain its function for flight characteristics.". In 1979, a specimen (TWCMS B5937.1) was described from Eppleton Quarry near Hetton-le-Hole, in Tyne and Wear in Northern England, in sediments that are part of the Marl Slate, a unit equivalent to the Kupferschiefer. This specimen was given a detailed description by Susan E. Evans in 1982, in the publication she placed Coelurosauravus and Weigeltisaurus into the new family Coelurosauravidae.

In 1987, Evans and Haubold proposed that Weigeltisaurus jaekeli represented a species of Coelurosauravus, and synonymised Gracilisaurus ottoi, which had been described from a disarticulated postcranial skeleton from the Kupferschiefer by Weigelt in 1930 with Weigeltisaurus jaekeli.

In 2007, Schaumberg, Unwin and Brandt presented and discussed new details of Weigeltisaurus skeletal anatomy, the mechanism of unfolding and folding the patagium and presented thin-sections of the rods with lamellar bone.

In 2015 in two separate publications, V. V. Bulanov & A. G. Sennikov redescribed Coelurosauravus elivensis and Coelurosauravus jaekeli and concluded that the generic separation should be maintained, restoring Weigeltisaurus as a valid genus.

In 2021, an extensive description of a mostly complete specimen of Weigeltisaurus (SMNK-PAL 2882) was published, this specimen was collected in 1992 from near the town of Ellrich in Saxony-Anhalt, and had briefly been described in a 1997 publication in Science. The counterpart of the specimen is in private collection and inaccessible to researchers.

=== List of specimens ===
- Greifswald specimen (SSWG 113/7): Holotype of Palaeochamaeleo/Weigeltisaurus/Coelurosauravus jaekeli (Weigelt, 1930). A partial skeleton including a well-preserved skull, vertebrae, limbs, and gliding structures.
- GM 1462: Holotype of Gracilisaurus ottoi (Weigelt, 1930). A partial skeleton including a forelimb, neck vertebrae, skull fragments, and gliding structures.
- Wolfsberg & Cornberg specimens: Privately owned specimens described by Schaumberg (1976).
- Eppleton specimen (TWCMS B.5937 1&2): A well-preserved partial skeleton including the torso, hindlimbs, part of the tail, and gliding structures all in articulation. The only Coelurosauravus specimen known from England, specifically the Marl Slate near Hetton-le-Hole, Tyne and Wear. First described in Nature by Pettigrew (1979).
- Bodental specimen: A privately owned specimen described by Schaumberg (1986).
- Ellrich specimen (SMNK 2882 PAL): A well-preserved and fully articulated complete skeleton first described in Science magazine by Frey, Sues, & Munk (1997).

== Description ==
Size of Weigeltisaurus (right) with wings outstretched, compared to the closely related Coelurosauravus (left) and the much smaller living gliding lizard Draco volans

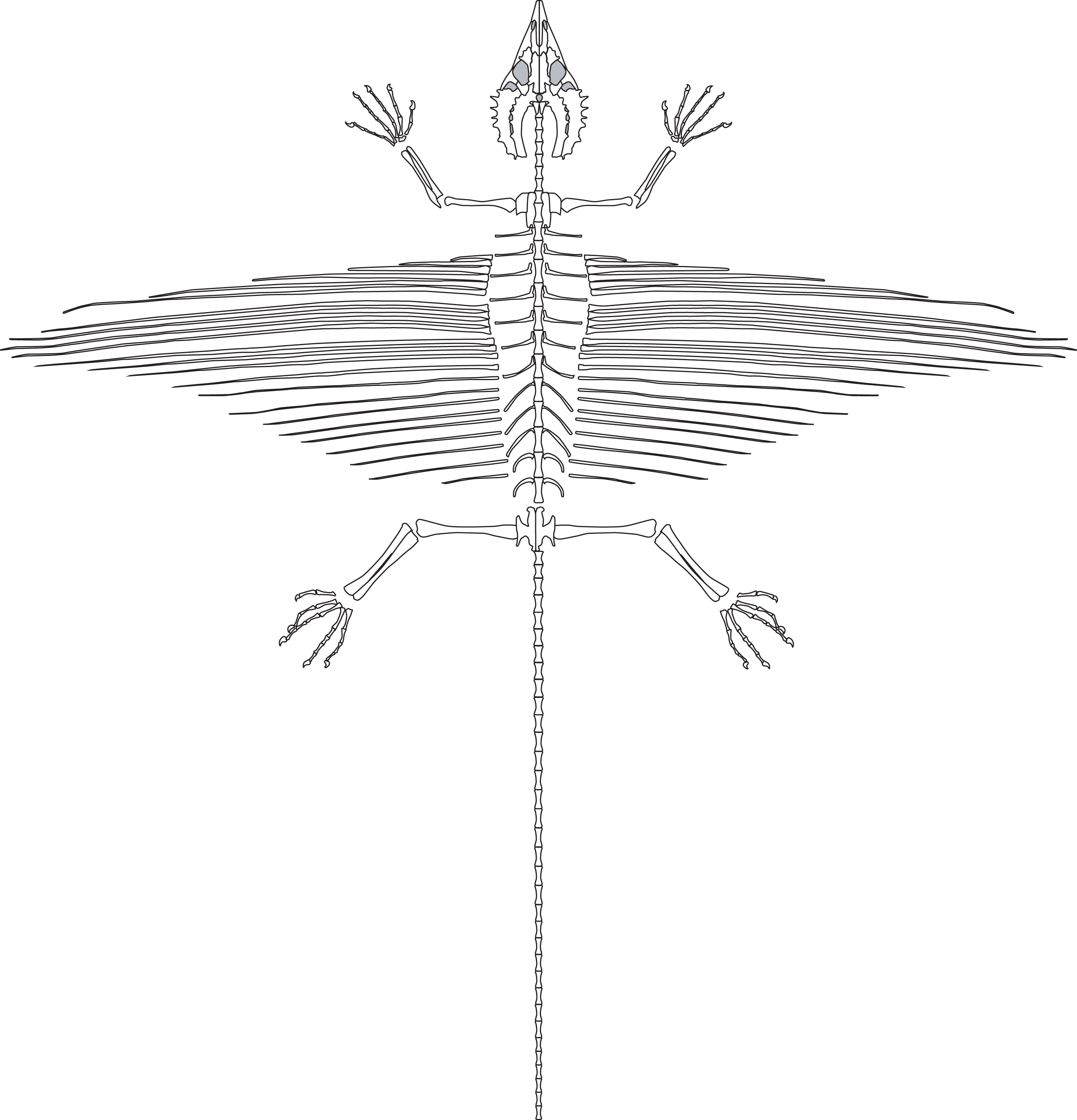
Diagram of the skeleton of Weigeltisaurus (note that gastralia are omitted)

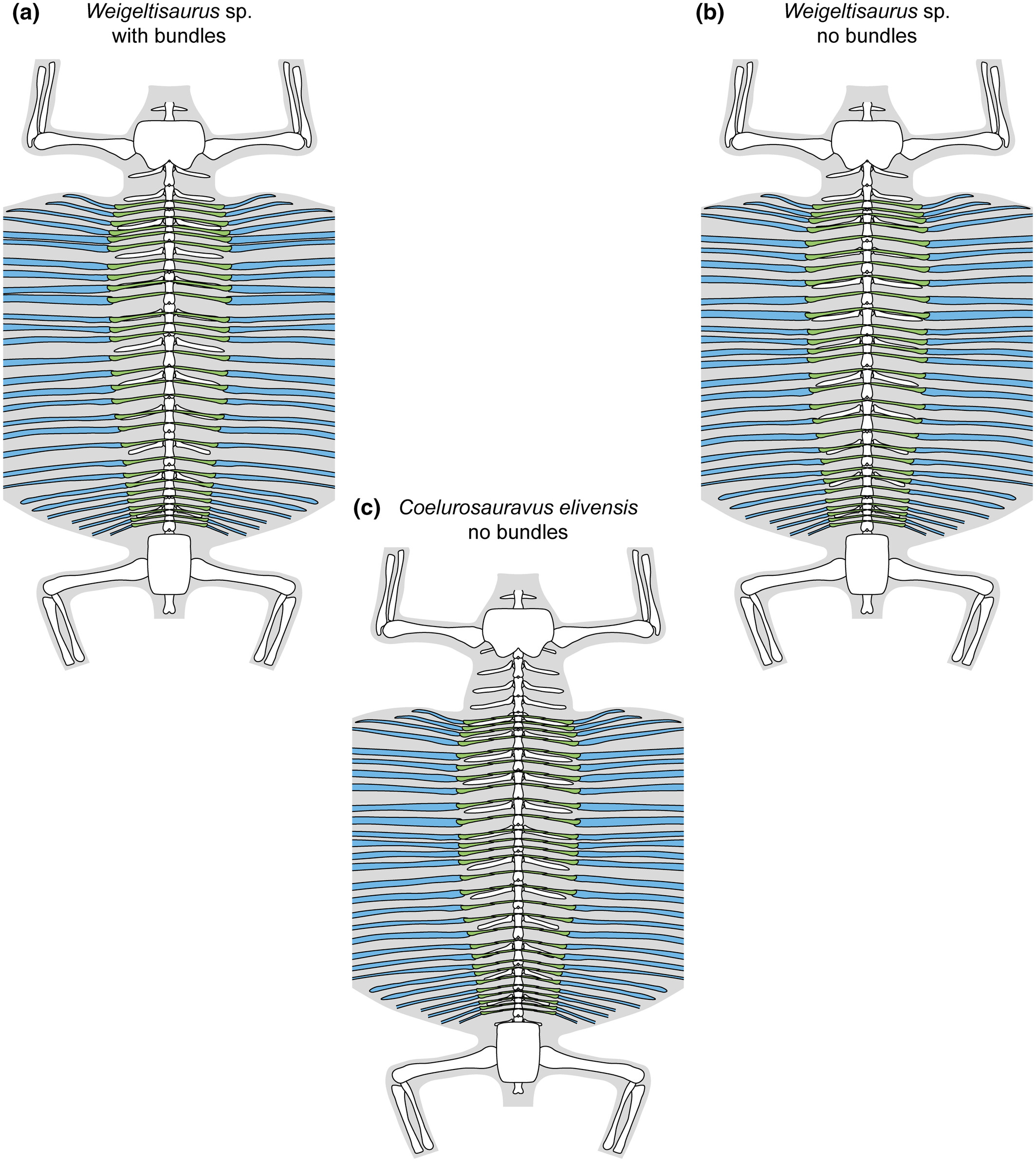
Diagram of the trunk of weigeltisaurids, showing attachment of the patagial bones (blue) to gastralia (green), and differing interpretation of the arrangement of the gastralia (green) in Weigeltisaurus based on preservation in different specimens

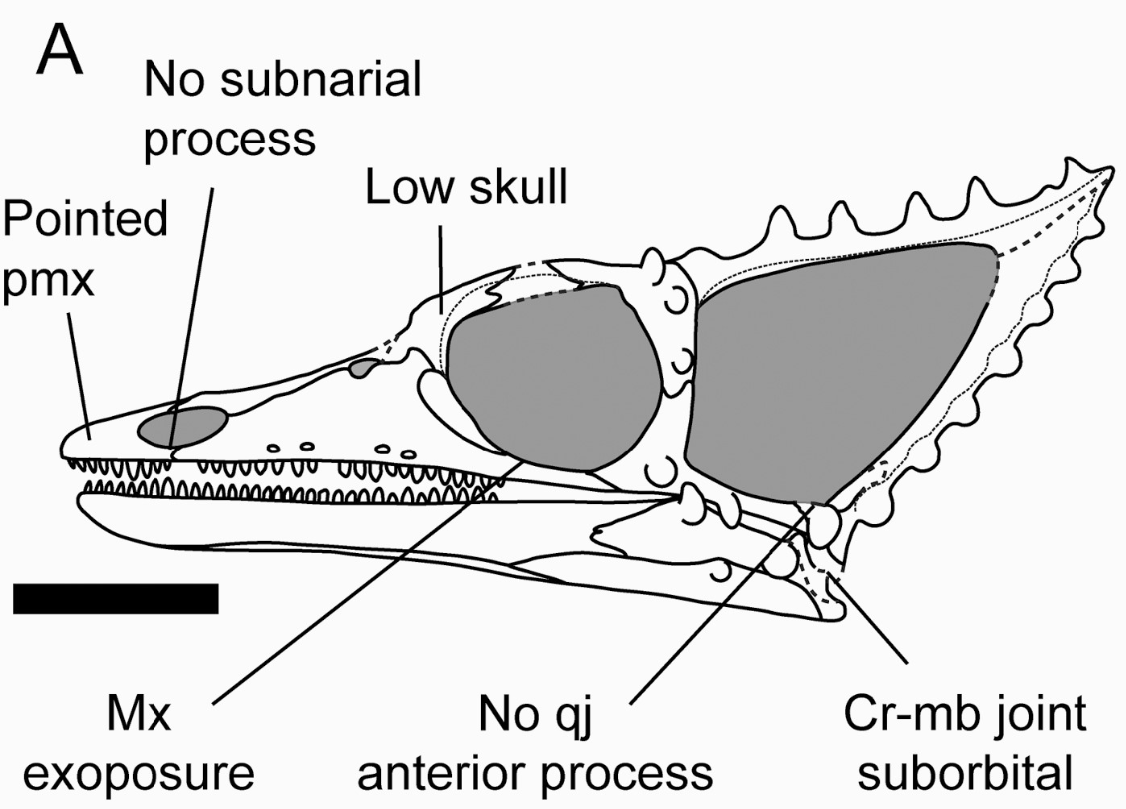
Reconstructed skull in side-on view. Scale bar = 1 cm

The skull of Weigeltisaurus is around 6 centimetres (2.4 in) long. Like other weigeltisaurids, the skull and lower jaws of Weigeltisaurus are covered in horns and tubercles, including a horned cranial frill present on both the parietal and squamosal bones. In contrast to the condition in Coelurosauravus and Glaurung, where only tubercles are present on the parietal. The teeth are slightly heterodont, with the front teeth being small and peg-like, while the back teeth are lance-shaped and recurved. The hands and feet have elongate phalanges, similar to those of extant arboreal lizards. At least 22 caudal vertebrae are present on the skeleton, the posterior caudal vertebrae have elongated centra, similar to those of extant lizards. The bones are largely hollow, exhibiting a high skeletal pneumaticity, with the outer cortical bone often less than 1 millimetre (3/64 in) thick. A minimum of 24 pairs of elongate bony rods are present along the trunk of Weigeltisaurus. They are not ribs, but distinct bones, dubbed "patagials". They have been proposed to represent either modified gastralia (unmodified gastralia are also present on the skeleton) or novel bone ossifications (the latter interpretation being favoured in recent publications). These rise in length posteriorly until the eighth and longest patagial, with subsequent patagials gradually decreasing in size. Weigeltisaurus is suggested to differ from Coelurosauravus in proportions of the skull, neck, trunk and patagials.

== Paleobiology ==
Like other weigeltisaurs, Weigeltisaurus is thought to have been an arboreal (tree-dwelling) insectivore.

=== Gliding ===
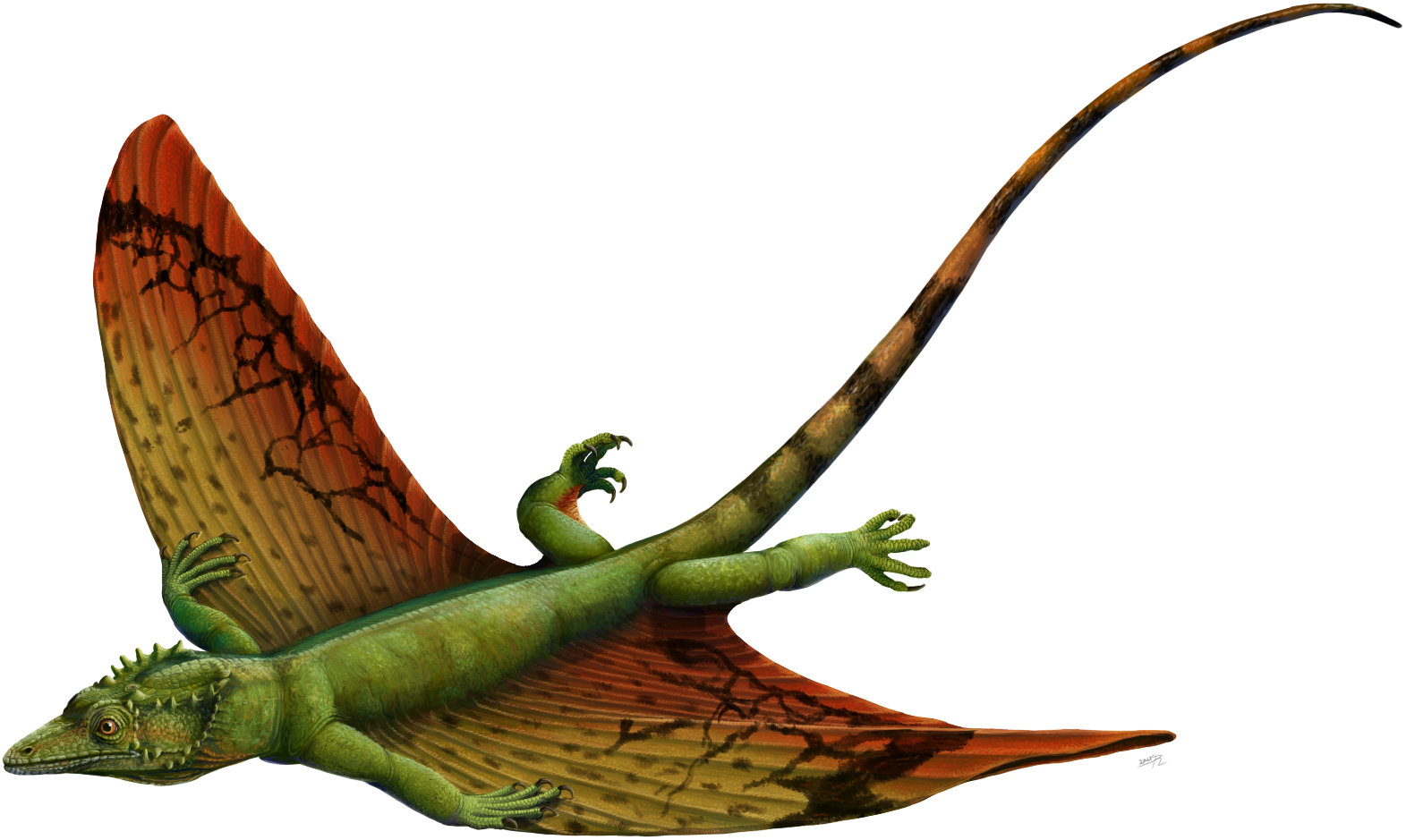
Artistic reconstruction of Weigeltisaurus jaekeli

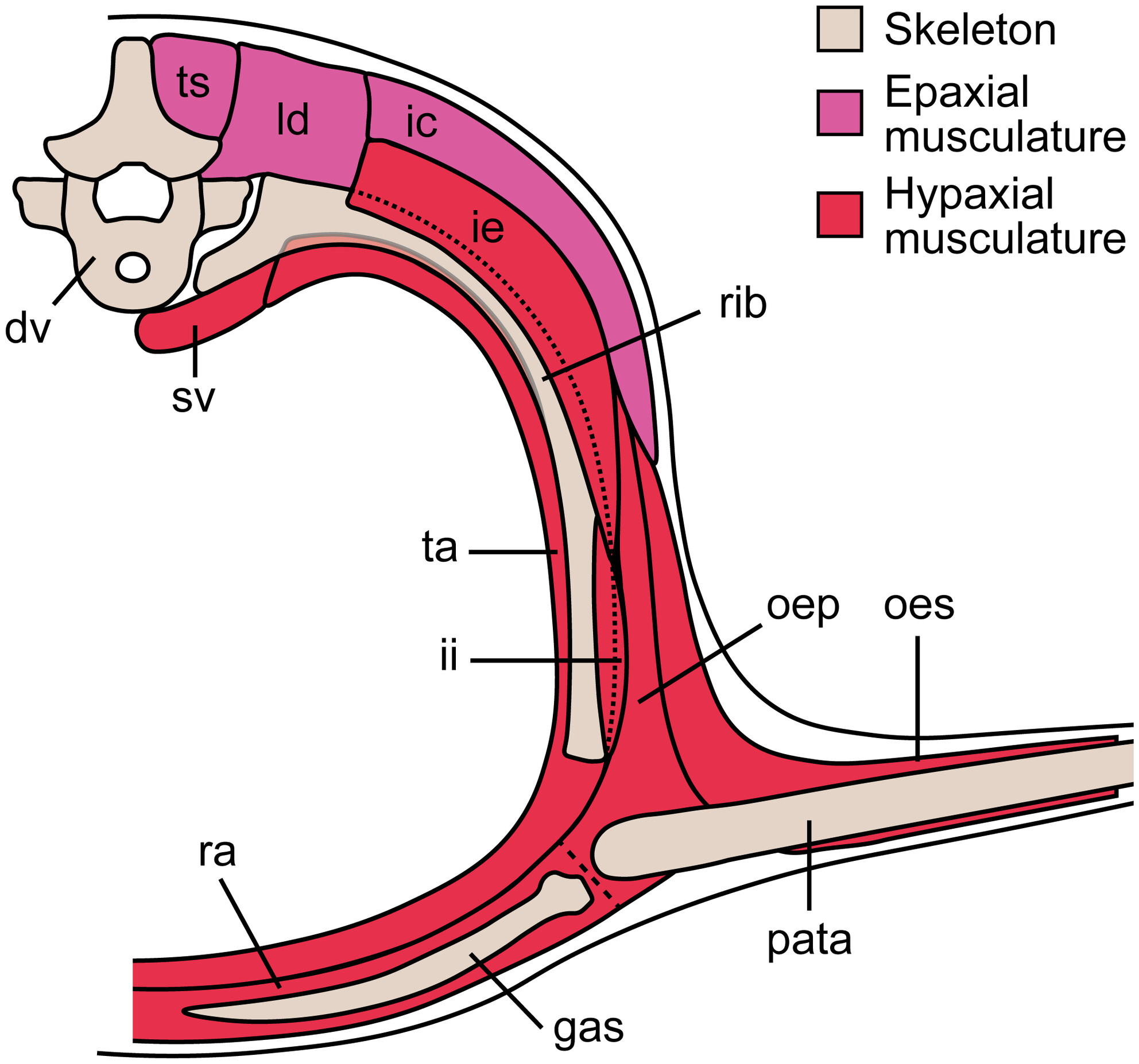
Trunk cross section of a weigeltisaurid, showing the articulation of the patagial bones (pata) with the gastralia (gas)

The gliding membrane of weigeltisaurids is distinct from those of other gliding reptiles, which originate from modified ribs originating from the upper-lateral surface of the body. In contrast, in weigeltisaurids, the rods originate from the lower-lateral surface of the body. The furling and unfurling of the gliding membrane were likely controlled by the abdominal muscles. The patagial bones had a dumbbell shaped cross section which enhanced their rigidity. Due to the low-wing configuration, it is likely that the gliding surface was angled upwards to increase stability. In living gliding lizards, it has been found that the forelimbs grab hold of the front of the membrane during takeoff, and are used to adjust the trajectory mid-flight. Similar behaviour has been proposed for weigeltisaurids. In a 2011 study comparing Coelurosauravus and other extinct gliding reptiles to modern Draco species, Coelurosauravus was found to be a less efficient glider due to its larger body size, with a steep descent angle of over 45 degrees and a consequent substantial drop in height per glide. A later 2025 study found that the body mass of Coelurosauravus had been overestimated and that it would have been a relatively efficient glider.

== Paleoenvironment ==
The Kupferschiefer and the equivalent Marl Slate is a marine unit that forms part of the Zechstein, a sequence of rocks formed on the edge of the Zechstein Sea, a large inland shallow sea that existed in Northern Europe during the Late Permian. The environment at the time of deposition is considered to have been semi-arid. The terrestrial flora of the Zechstein is dominated by conifers, with seed ferns also being common, while taeniopterids, ginkgophytes and sphenophytes are rare. Other terrestrial vertebrates found in the Kupfershiefer and lower Zechstein include the fellow weigeltisaurid Glaurung, the early archosauromorph Protorosaurus, the pareiasaur Parasaurus, the cynodont Procynosuchus, and indeterminate captorhinids, dicynodonts and dissorophid temnospondyls.
