= Mirasaura =

Mirasaura Temporal range: Middle Triassic (early Anisian), 247 Ma
- Holotype specimen

Scientific classification
- Kingdom: Animalia
- Phylum: Chordata
- Class: Reptilia
- Clade: Neodiapsida
- Clade: †Drepanosauromorpha
- Genus: †Mirasaura; Spiekman et al., 2025
- Species: †M. grauvogeli

Binomial name
- †Mirasaura grauvogeli Spiekman et al., 2025

Genus of fossil reptile

Mirasaura (meaning "wonderful reptile") is an extinct genus of drepanosauromorph reptile known from the Middle Triassic (Anisian age) Grès à Voltzia Formation of France. The genus contains a single species, Mirasaura grauvogeli. Like the closely related Longisquama, it bears an unusual crest of elongated appendages over its back, likely serving a display purpose. Mirasaura is known from two partial skeletons preserving the skull, most of the body, and the soft tissue crest, in addition to 80 incomplete specimens preserving isolated parts of this crest.

== Discovery and naming ==
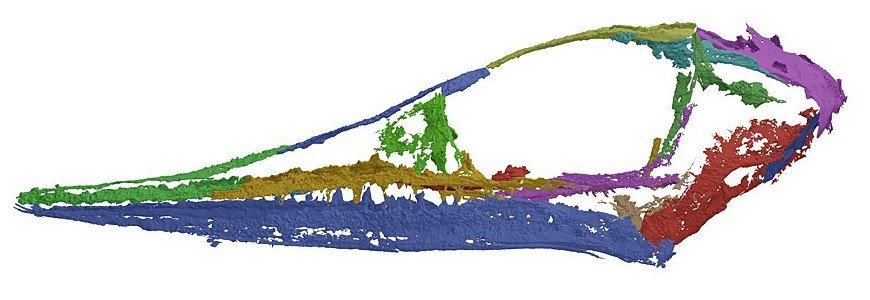
Reconstructed skull of the holotype based on μCT scans

The Mirasaura fossil material was primarily discovered by Louis Grauvogel while excavating fossils in the Vosges mountains. This fossiliferous locality, which represents outcrops of the lower part of the Grès à Voltzia Formation, is found in the Lorraine region of eastern France, spanning around 100 km from north to south and 40 km from east to west. In May 1939, Grauvogel collected two partial skeletons, identified as reptilian in nature. While the skeletal material was recognized as belonging to an indeterminate reptile genus, Grauvogel noted the presence of a preserved soft tissue structure rising above the animal's dorsum (back), which he first identified as a fish fin. Later researchers proposed that it instead represented the wing of an insect or parts of a plant. It was not until 2019, when Grauvogel's fossil collection was acquired by the State Museum of Natural History Stuttgart, that this structure was recognized as part of the reptile's anatomy. The two specimens preserving skeletal material are accessioned as SMNS 97278—an articulated, nearly complete skull along with the poorly preserved postcranium, in addition to most of the soft tissue crest—and SMNS 97279—a partial skull, much of the postcranium, and part of the crest. 80 additional specimens representing the soft tissue crest, ranging from nearly complete to isolated appendages, are also referable to this animal.

In 2025, Stephan N. F. Spiekman and colleagues described Mirasaura grauvogeli as a new genus and species of drepanosauromorph reptile based on these fossil remains. They established specimen SMNS 97278 as the holotype. The generic name, Mirasaura, combines the Latin mira, meaning 'wonderful' or 'marvelous', with the Ancient Greek σαύρα (saura), meaning "reptile" or "lizard". The specific name, grauvogeli, honours Louis Grauvogel, the discoverer of the Mirasaura material and many other fossils in nearby localities.

== Description ==
External image
- Anatomy of Mirasaura: holotype (a–c) and referred (c–g) specimens, reconstructed skeleton (h)

Size of two specimens of Mirasaura including the holotype SMNS 97278 (left) and the holotype of Longisquama compared to a human hand. A considerably larger isolated crest (SMNS 97280) of Mirasaura exists but is not shown here.

The skull of Mirasaura has the superficially bird-like appearance typical of drepanosaurs, with a long, tapering snout, domed skull roof, and large, somewhat forward-facing eye sockets. Teeth are present in the sides of the jaws, but the tip of the snout is toothless. Mirasaura differs from Longisquama in having the teeth extend less far down the jaws. The skull of the M. grauvogeli holotype specimen (SMNS 97278) is very small, at 1.7 centimetres (0.67 in) long. The vertebral column consists of seven cervical vertebrae, 24 dorsal vertebrae, and two sacral vertebrae. The number of tail vertebrae is unknown. The anterior (toward the front) dorsal vertebrae are curved, with enlarged neural spines, giving it a humped back, as in many other drepanosaurs but unlike its close relative Longisquama. The forelimb lacks the extreme claw-associated modifications that characterize drepanosaurids such as Drepanosaurus.

Like its close relative Longisquama, Mirasaura possessed a tall crest made of superficially feather-like integumentary structures over its back. The common preservation of these structures in isolation implies they may have been regularly molted. Analysis of preserved melanosomes of the integumentary structures found them to be more similar to true feathers than to scales, though the structures are not thought to have a common origin. The crest is around 5.1 cm (2.0 in) tall in the holotype, only a third of the height of the isolated crest SMNS 97280, which reached at least 15.3 cm (6.0 in), which along with other anatomical details suggests that the holotype specimen represents a relatively young individual.

== Classification ==
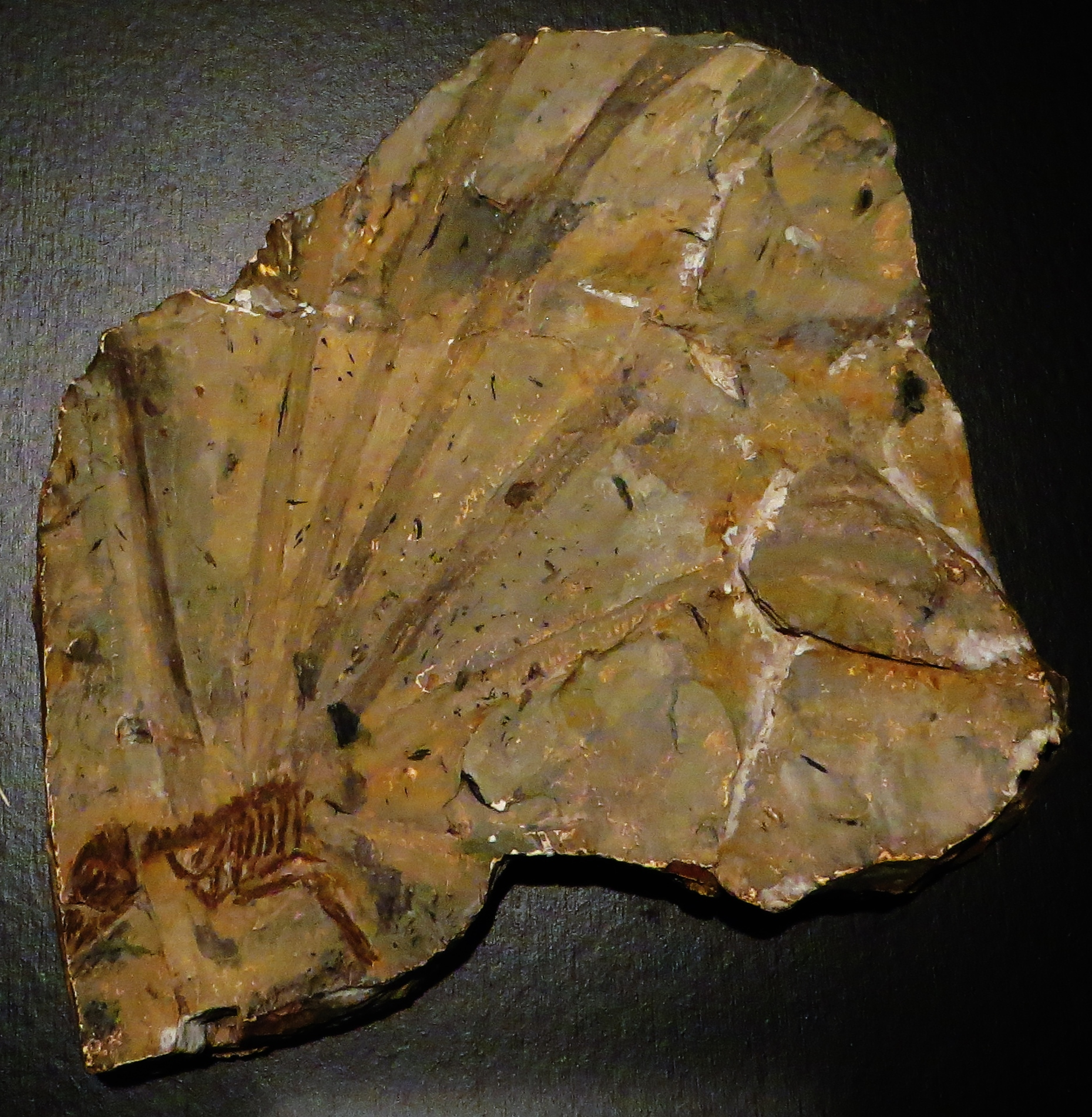
Holotype cast of the closely related Longisquama insignis

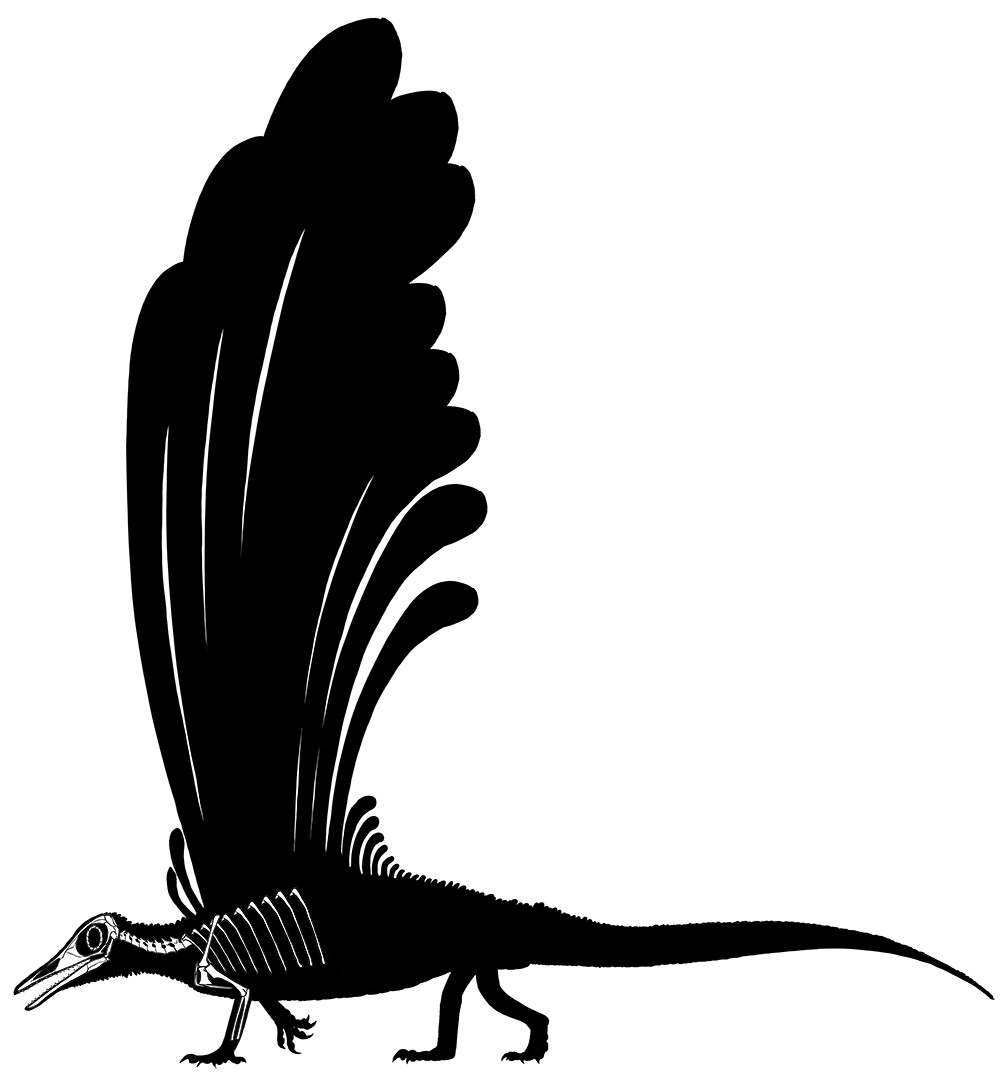
Reconstructed skeleton of L. insignis

In their phylogenetic analysis, Spiekman and colleagues recovered Mirasaura as a member of the Drepanosauromorpha, as the sister taxon to Longisquama. The exact position of drepanosauromorphs within the sauropsid clade Neodiapsida is uncertain due to the presence of an unresolved polytomy at the base of this group. These results are displayed in the cladogram below:

- Neodiapsida
  - †Drepanosauromorpha
    - †Hypuronector
    - - - †Longisquama
        - †Mirasaura
      - - †Vallesaurus
        - - †Dolabrosaurus
          - †Megalancosaurus
          - - †Avicranium
            - †Drepanosaurus
  - †Weigeltisauridae
    ⊞
    - †Coelurosauravus
    - - †Rautiania spp.
      - †Weigeltisaurus
    ⊟
  - †Claudiosaurus
  - †Younginiformes
    ⊞
    - - †Acerosodontosaurus
      - †Hovasaurus
      - †Thadeosaurus
    - - †Youngina
      - †Scyllacerta
    ⊟
  - Sauria (Crown group reptiles)
    - Archosauromorpha
    - - Pantestudines
      - Lepidosauromorpha

== Paleobiology ==
Mirasaura has been suggested to have been a tree-dwelling (arboreal) organism that, like other drepanosaurs, probably had a prehensile tail and likely fed on insects and other small invertebrates. The single vertical row of back structures of Mirasaura and Longisquama were not effective for gliding, but instead likely served as elaborate display structures.
