= Fabanychus =

Fabanychus Temporal range: Late Triassic (mid-Norian), ~215–209 Ma

Scientific classification
- Kingdom: Animalia
- Phylum: Chordata
- Class: Reptilia
- Clade: Neodiapsida
- Clade: †Drepanosauromorpha
- Genus: †Fabanychus; Sodano et al., 2025
- Species: †F. monos

Binomial name
- †Fabanychus monos Sodano et al., 2025

Genus of drepanosauromorph reptiles

Fabanychus (lit. 'bean claw') is an extinct genus of drepanosauromorph reptiles known from the Late Triassic (Norian age) of the United States. The genus contains a single species, Fabanychus monos, known from several isolated hand claws found in outcrops assigned to the Revueltian teilzone in the Chinle Formation of Arizona and Cooper Canyon Formation of Texas. The shape and curvature of the claws of Fabanychus are similar to those of the contemporary drepanosauromorph Ancistronychus, and indicate it likely had a fossorial ecology, meaning it was well-adapted to digging.

== Discovery and naming ==
The Fabanychus fossil material was discovered in multiple localities in Arizona and Texas, all of which can be referred to the Revueltian local teilzone, a biochronological unit identified by the tetrapod fossils found there. The holotype specimen—accessioned as PEFO 50566—and five additional specimens identified as paratypes were found in outcrops of the Chinle Formation (Sonsela Member, Bowman locality) in Petrified Forest National Park (PEFO) of Navajo County, Arizona, US. Another specimen from the DMNH 2018-05 (Green Layer) locality of the same member of the Chinle Formation was also identified as belonging to the same species, as was one collected from the Cooper Canyon Formation (middle unit, Headquarters Site) in Garza County, Texas. All eight specimens represent isolated unguals (claws) from the second digit of the hand.

In 2025, Megan P. Sodano and colleagues described Fabanychus monos as a new genus and species of drepanosauromorph reptiles based on these fossil remains. The generic name, Fabanychus, combines the Latin word faba, meaning 'bean' with the Greek word nychus, meaning 'claw', referencing the beanlike shape of the animal's enlarged hand claws. The specific name, monos, is a Greek word meaning 'alone', referencing the discovery of all eight specimens in isolation. Sodano and colleagues histologically sectioned two of the paratype claws to observe the internal structure.

== Description and classification ==
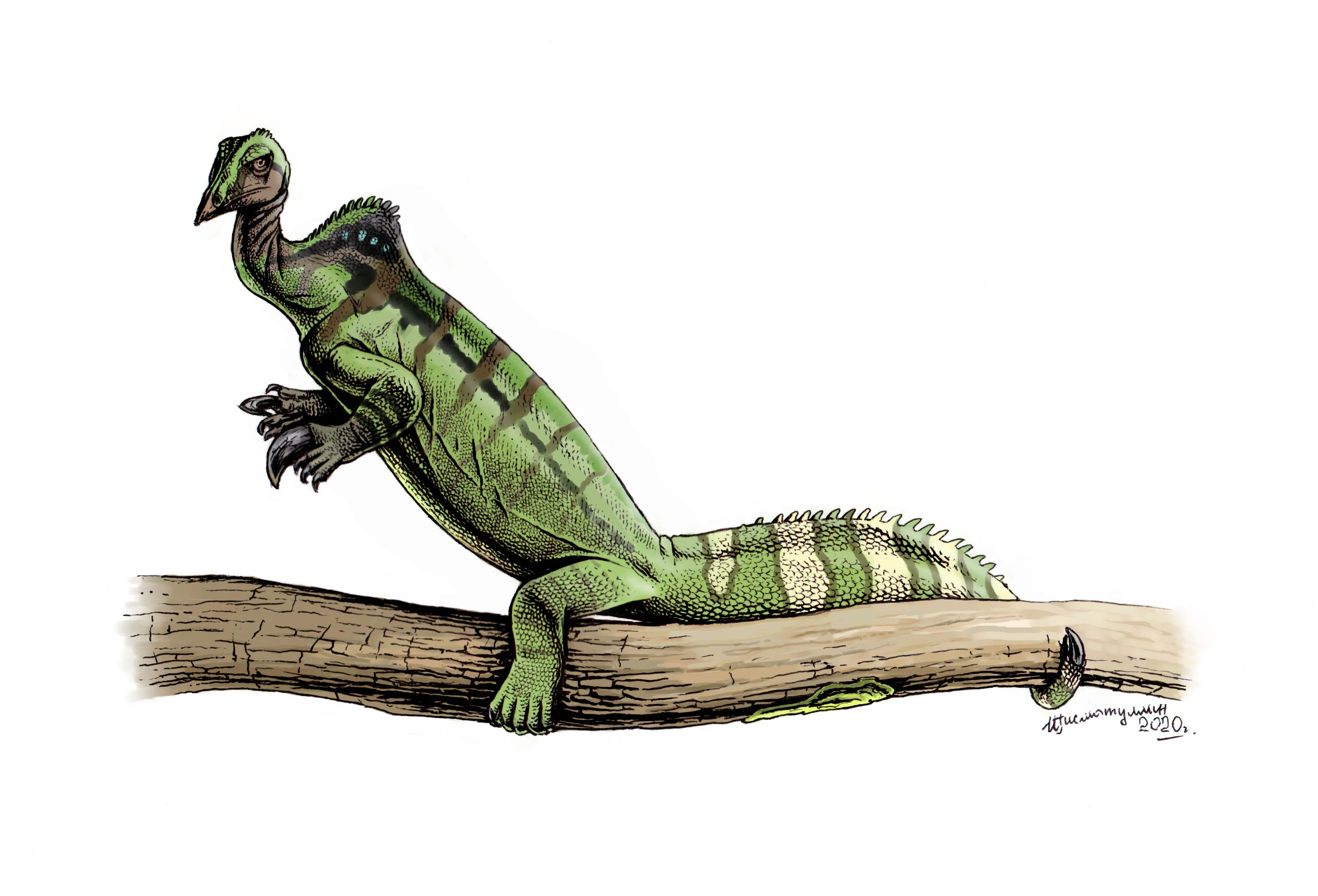
Speculative life restoration of the related Drepanosaurus, which may have had an arboreal lifestyle

Fabanychus is one of multiple drepanosauromorphs from the southwestern United States known only from hypertrophied second manual unguals (hand claws); others include Ancistronychus, Skybalonyx, and Unguinychus, all of which can be distinguished by distinct morphologies of their claws. Of these genera, Fabanychus is most similar to Ancistronychus, sharing a similar curvature and arrangement of foramina (small holes), tuberosities (bumps), and lack of cortical bone (hard outer layer) on the dorsal (top) and distal (toward the tip) surfaces of the claw. The claws of Skybalonyx and Unguinychus exhibit a flatter morphology with a more shallow curve, while those of Drepanosaurus—known from more complete remains—are much more robust and strongly curved. Avicranium, Dolabrosaurus, and Drepanosaurus are also known from the southwest United States geographic region, albeit from more complete cranial or postcranial remains.

=== Paleobiology ===
The inner (63.6°) and outer (166.5°) curvature of the claws are intermediate between Ancistronychus and Skybalonyx, which are recognized as likely having a fossorial or subterranean (digging or underground) ecology. Drepanosaurus, with its strongly hooked claws, is interpreted as having an arboreal to semi-arboreal (climbing in trees) ecology.

== See also ==
- 2025 in reptile paleontology
- Paleobiota of the Chinle Formation
