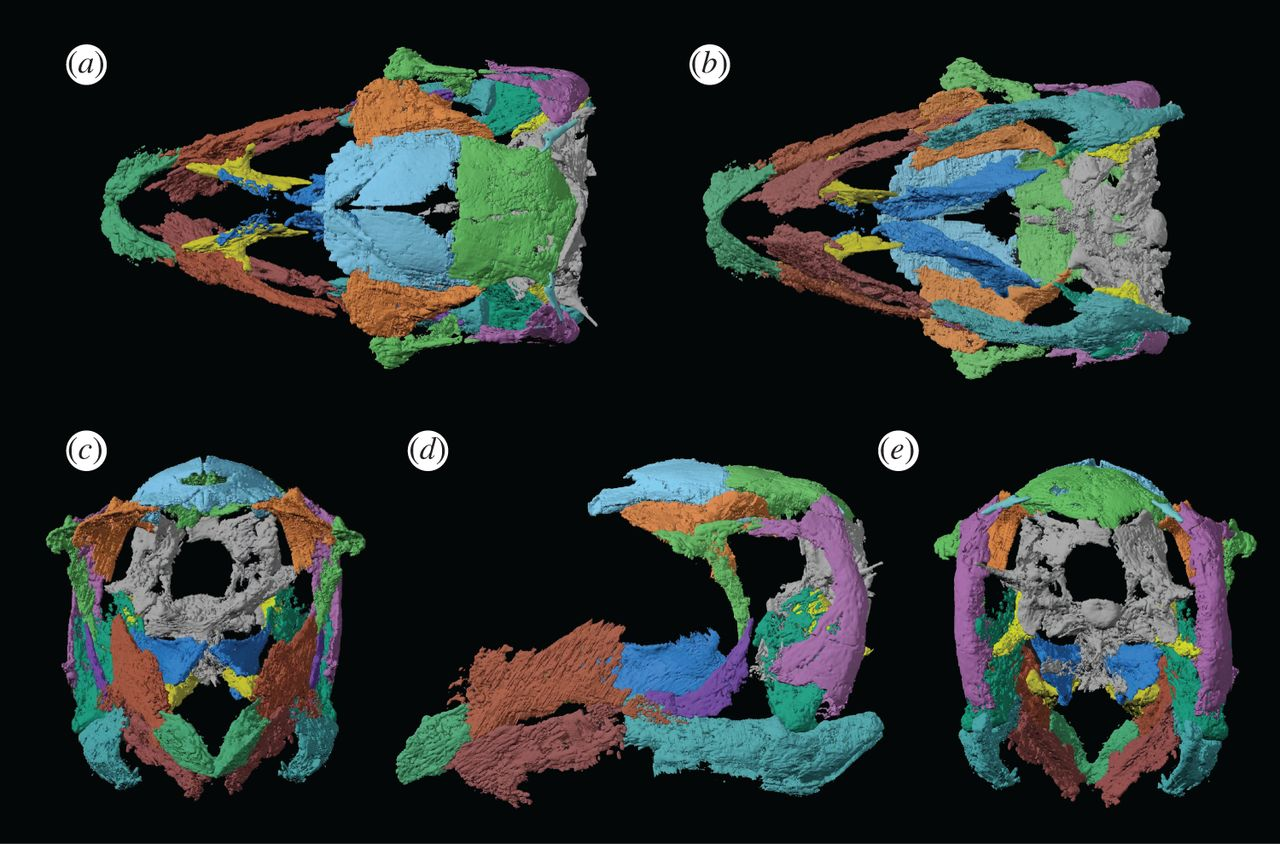
- A 3D reconstruction of Avicranium's skull in multiple views.

Scientific classification
- Kingdom: Animalia
- Phylum: Chordata
- Class: Reptilia
- Clade: †Drepanosauromorpha
- Family: †Drepanosauridae
- Genus: †Avicranium; Pritchard & Nesbitt, 2017

Type species
- Avicranium renestoi Pritchard & Nesbitt, 2017

= Avicranium =

Avicranium Temporal range: Late Norian–Rhaetian ~213–203 Ma

Extinct genus of reptiles

Avicranium is a genus of extinct drepanosaur reptile known from the Chinle Formation of the late Triassic. The type species of Avicranium is Avicranium renestoi. "Avicranium" is Latin for "bird cranium", in reference to its unusual bird-like skull, while "renestoi" references Silvio Renesto, a paleontologist known for studies of Italian drepanosaurs.

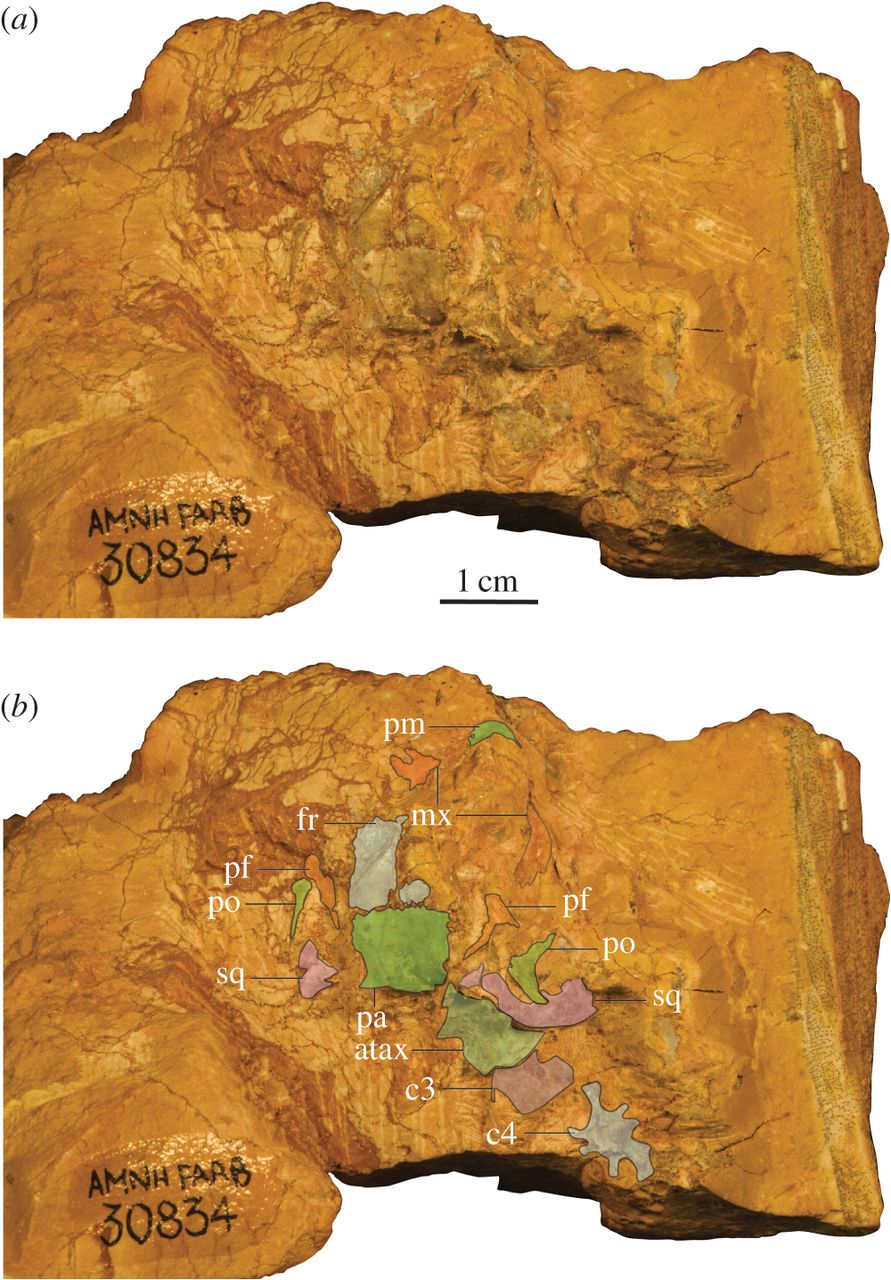
AMNH FARB 30834, mostly obscured by rock.

== Discovery ==
The holotype and only known specimen of Avicranium is AMNH FARB 30834, a disarticulated skull attached to a few cervical (neck) vertebrae. This specimen hails from the Coelophysis (or Whitaker) quarry at Ghost Ranch in New Mexico, USA. This quarry belongs to the 'siltstone member' of the Chinle formation, which corresponds to the late Norian to early Rhaetian stages of the Triassic. Various unprepared blocks from this locality were excavated by American Museum of Natural History field parties during the 1940s. Long believed to only contain multiple specimens of the early dinosaur Coelophysis, these blocks are now known to contain a multitude of different Triassic reptiles. AMNH FARB 30834 was uncovered during the preparation of a block containing the holotype of Effigia okeeffeae, a large shuvosaurid pseudosuchian. Multiple other drepanosaur vertebrae and limb fragments have also been found in the block, although it is unclear whether they belong to the same specimen as AMNH FARB 308344.

Despite AMNH FARB 30834 being disarticulated and partially covered by the rock matrix, many of its bones are well-preserved and the specimen as a whole was micro-CT scanned, revealing elements hidden under rock. This scan allowed the skull to be reconstructed in 3D using digital software. An endocast of the brain was also digitally constructed from the skull. Avicranium has the most well-preserved skull material of any drepanosaur.

== Description ==
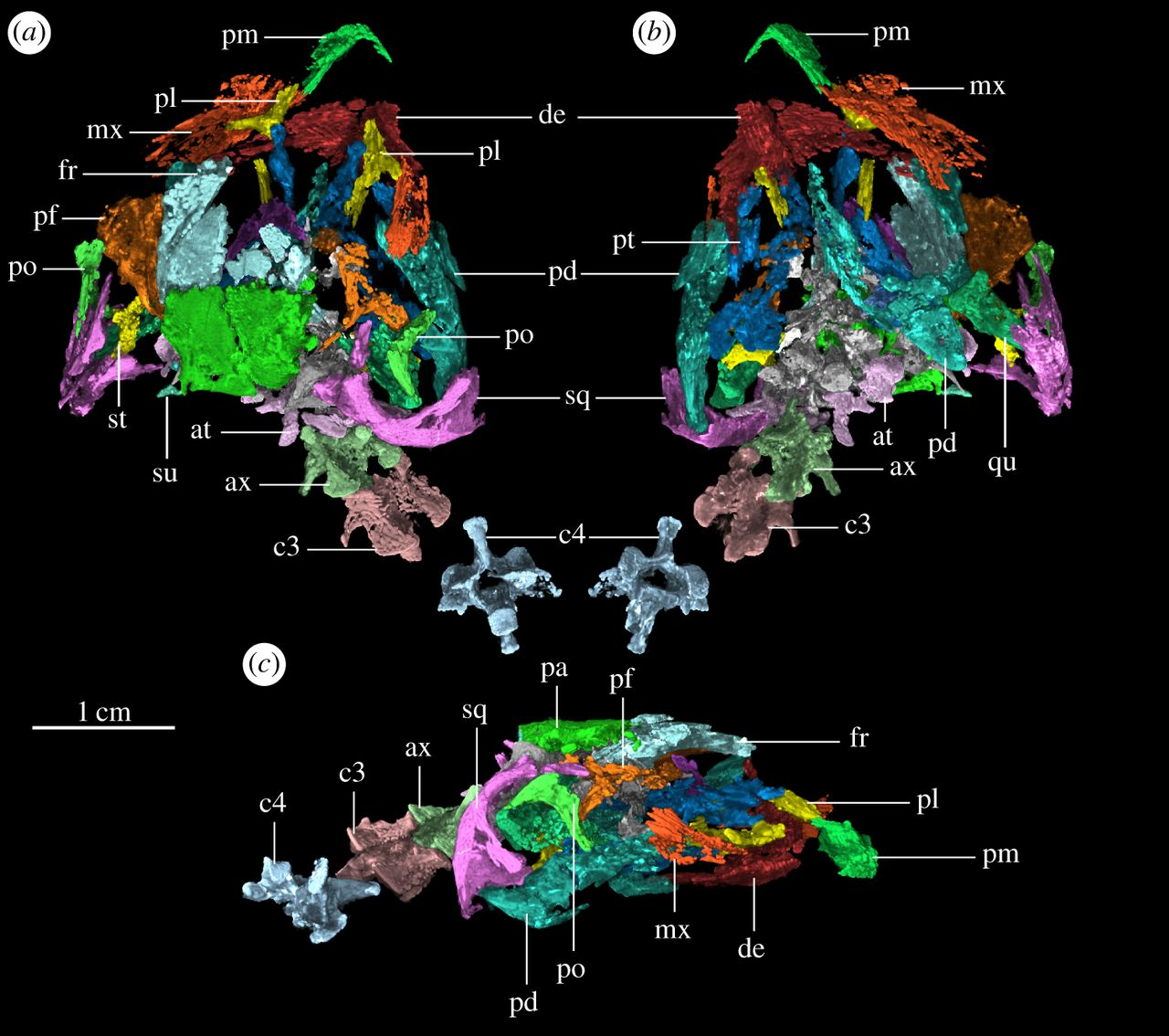
The micro-CT scan of AMNH FARB 30834

AMNH FARB 30834 can be recognized as a drepanosaur due to several traits of its vertebrae. The articular surfaces of its vertebral centres are heterocoelous (saddle-shaped). The neural spines are anteroposteriorly short and strongly anterodorsally inclined. These features closely resemble those of Drepanosaurus.

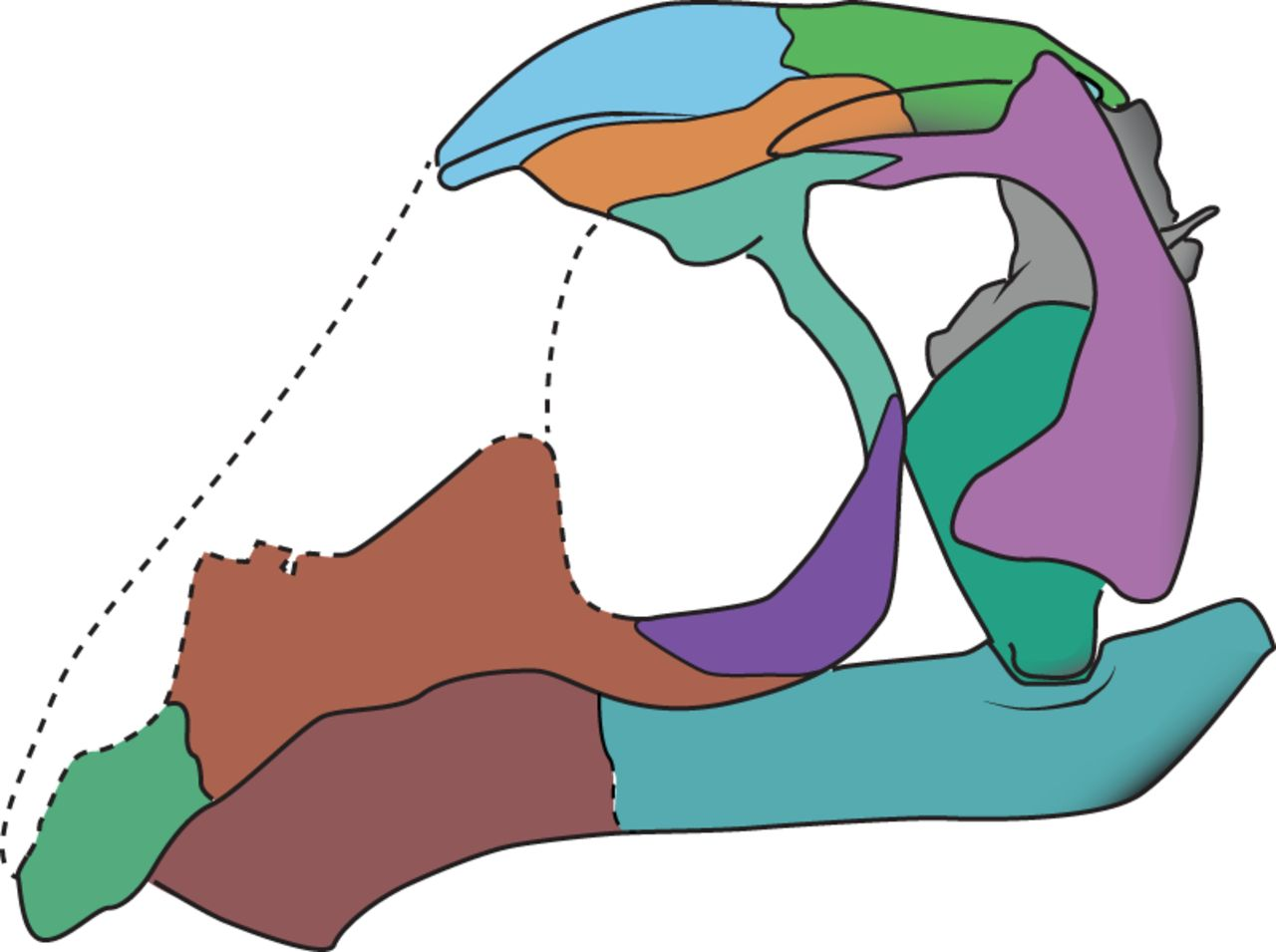
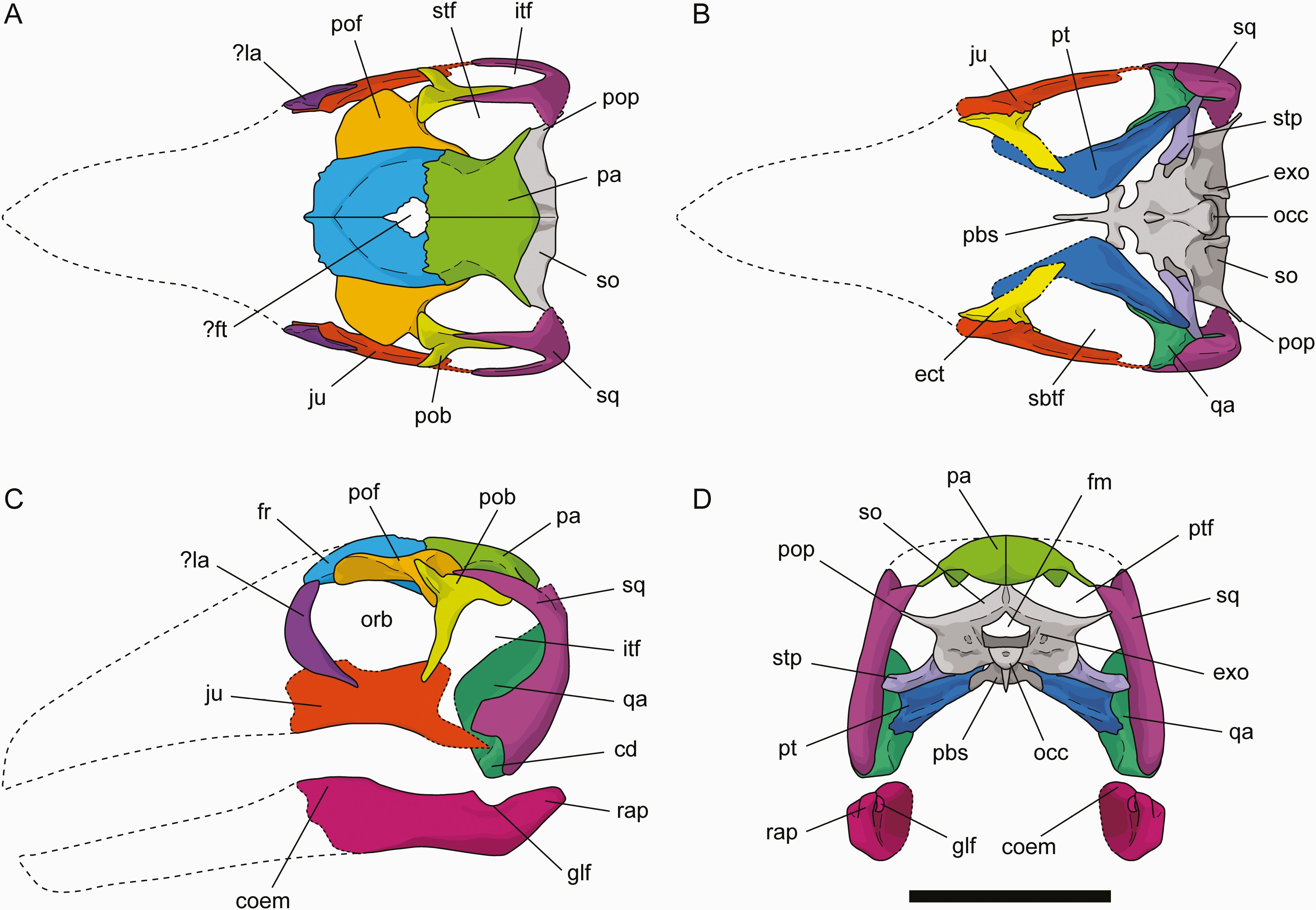
Drawings of the skull of Avicranium as reconstructed by Pritchard & Nesbitt (2017), top, and Buffa et al. (2024), bottom.

However, the most notable feature of AMNH FARB 30834 is its skull, which as initially reconstructed by Pritchard and Nesbitt shares many similarities with the skulls of modern birds. The snout is slender and tapering, similar to that of Megalancosaurus, although it differs from Megalancosaurus by being completely toothless. The frontal, postfrontal, and postorbital bones (above and behind the eyes) project outwards, forcing the orbits to face forwards. The frontal and parietal bones are both broad and thick, creating a high and domed cranium. According to the digital endocast of the specimen, this domed cranium held an enlarged brain with large optic lobes.

On the other hand, the skull also possesses many primitive features. The squamosal is tall and anteroposteriorly broad, and possesses bony plates which frame the quadrate from the side and rear. This is similar to the condition in captorhinids and Araeoscelis, but unlike that of neodiapsids, which only have the quadrate framed from the side. The quadrate itself is also stouter than that of neodiapsids and lacks a concave rear edge and a dorsal extension which articulates with the squamosal. The occipital condyle of the braincase possesses a deep pit, while the foramen ovale is very large.

The stapes is massive, similar to the condition in other early reptiles. Combined with a straight quadrate without a tympanic crest, this indicates that Avicranium (and presumably other drepanosaurs) lacked a tympanic membrane (eardrum), and that the drepanosauromorph lineage evolved before more advanced diapsids (such as saurians) acquired tympanic membranes.

Avicranium can be distinguished from Hypuronector, Megalancosaurus, and Vallesaurus (the only other drepanosaurs with preserved skulls) due to the following features:

- The complete absence of teeth.
- A tall and triangular retroarticular process.
- Cervical neural spines which are approximately as wide as they are long.

An alternative reconstruction of the skull was proposed in 2024 by Valentin Buffa and colleagues, who reidentified many of the bones in Pritchard and Nesbitt's original reconstruction. Most notably, they did not identify any of the preserved bones as those of the rostrum and so could not confirm if Avicranium was indeed toothless. They also reinterpreted several of the bones around the eyes, namely identifying the maxilla as a jugal and the former jugal as a lacrimal. This noticeably decreases the size of the orbit from the original reconstruction. They also altered the position of the postorbital, placing it more behind the postfrontal than laterally, decreasing the overall width of the rear skull. This correspondingly pushes back the squamosal and quadrate and creates a steeper incline down to the jaw joint.

== Paleobiology ==
The binocular eyes and enlarged brain of Avicranium are likely adaptations to an arboreal lifestyle, as such a lifestyle requires advanced sensory processing, such as depth perception and three-dimensional navigation. It is very likely that these features convergently evolved with those of pterosaurs and modern birds, which would require similar sensory processing during flight. An arboreal lifestyle has been previously proposed for other members of the drepanosauromorph lineage.
