= Unguinychus =

Unguinychus Temporal range: Late Triassic, mid-Norian

Scientific classification
- Kingdom: Animalia
- Phylum: Chordata
- Class: Reptilia
- Clade: †Drepanosauromorpha
- Family: †Drepanosauridae
- Genus: †Unguinychus; Pugh et al., 2024
- Species: †U. onyx

Binomial name
- †Unguinychus onyx Pugh et al., 2024

Genus of drepanosaurid reptiles

Unguinychus (meaning "claw claw") is an extinct genus of drepanosaurid reptiles from the Late Triassic Garita Creek Formation of New Mexico, United States. The genus contains a single species, U. onyx, known from several partial claws. In contrast to some of its relatives that may have been arboreal, Unguinychus may have been a more fossorial species. Based on the morphology of the claws, Unguinychus appears to be most similar to Skybalonyx, another possibly fossorial drepanosaur from the Chinle Formation of Arizona.

== Discovery and naming ==
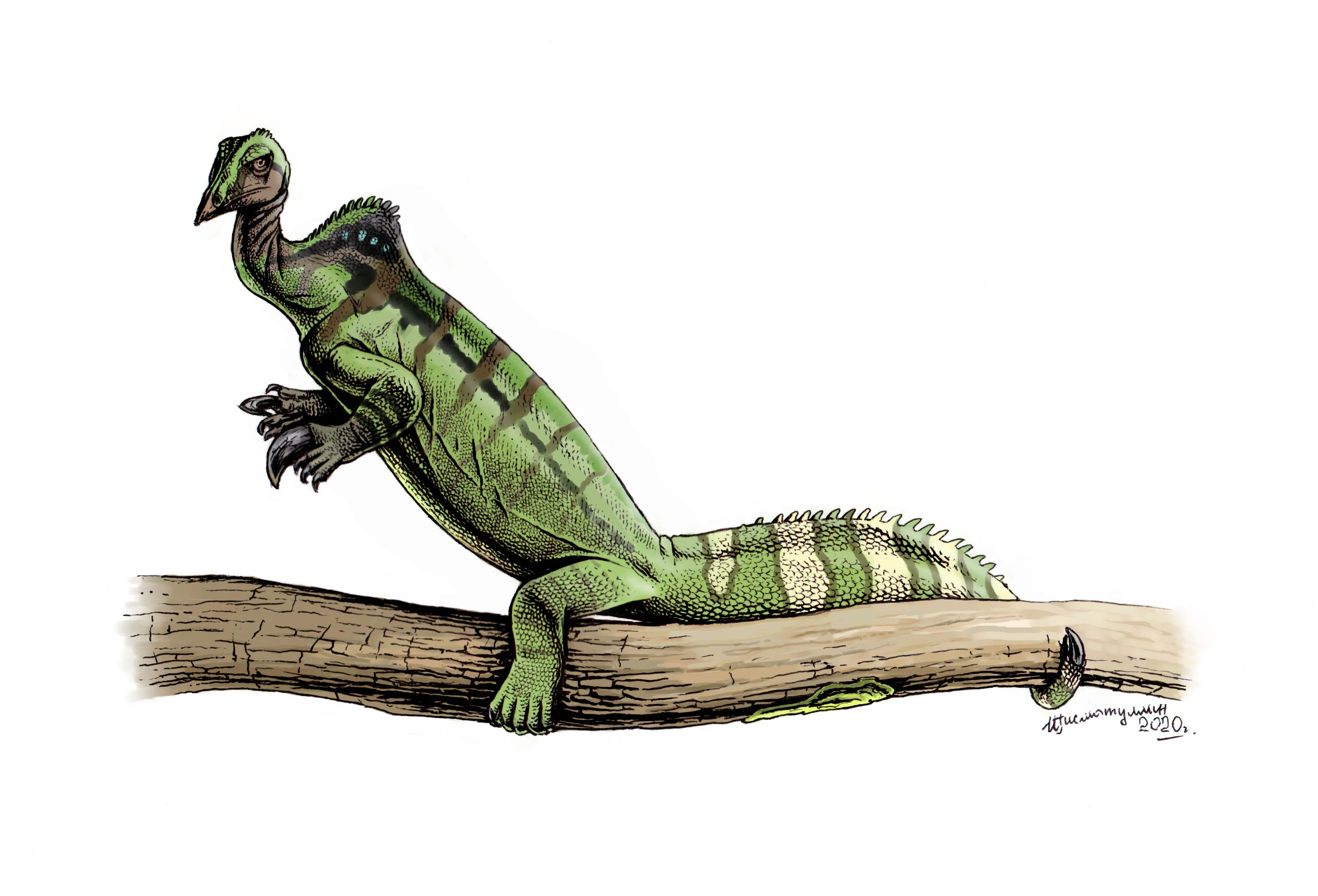
Life restoration of the related Drepanosaurus, which may have had an arboreal lifestyle

The Unguinychus fossil material, was discovered in sediments of the Garita Creek Formation (Homestead Site) on a cattle ranch in San Miguel County, New Mexico. The holotype specimen, LF 5575, consists of a manual ungual (hand claw) from the second digit, missing the tip. Nine other unguals—also missing their pointed tips—presumably from the second manual digit as well, were assigned to Unguinychus as paratypes.

Other drepanosaurid fossil material was found at the same locality as Unguinychus, including caudal unguals (tail claws) and fragmentary cervical, dorsal, and caudal vertebrae. While these bones may also belong to Unguinychus, Pugh et al. (2024) refrained from making this referral due to a lack of associated and overlapping skeletal material.

In 2024, Pugh et al. described Unguinychus onyx as a new genus and species of drepanosaurid based on these fossil remains. The binomial combines the Latin word "unguis", and the Greek words "nychus" and "onyx", all of which mean "claw". As such, the full scientific name means "claw claw claw", referencing the fact that unguals are the only known bone of the species.
