= Skybalonyx =

Skybalonyx Temporal range: Late Triassic ~223–220 Ma

Scientific classification
- Kingdom: Animalia
- Phylum: Chordata
- Class: Reptilia
- Clade: †Drepanosauromorpha
- Clade: †Elyurosauria
- Family: †Drepanosauridae
- Genus: †Skybalonyx; Jenkins et al., 2020
- Species: †S. skapter

Binomial name
- †Skybalonyx skapter Jenkins et al., 2020

Extinct genus of reptiles

Skybalonyx is an extinct genus of drepanosaur from the Chinle Formation in the Late Triassic. The type and only known species is Skybalonyx skapter, meaning "digging dung claw" from Ancient Greek, in reference to the association of this taxon's claws with coprolites, or fossilized dung. Skybalonyx is only known from numerous specimens of the enlarged claw on its second finger, characteristic of other derived drepanosaurids. However, Skybalonyx is unique compared to other drepanosaurs because its enlarged claw is wider than it is tall, and it is not as deep compared to those of the contemporary Drepanosaurus or Ancistronychus. Furthermore, the paired articular condyles of the ungual of this taxon remain distinct, unlike later drepanosaurids that often possess confluent articular condyles.

Functional analyses of its claws compared to other drepanosaurs and various living animals indicates that Skybalonyx (as well as Ancistronychus) used its large claw for digging underground, perhaps even for burrowing. This contrasts with the inferred lifestyle of other drepanosaurids (including Drepanosaurus), which were arboreal.

Reports published in October 2020 indicate its remains were discovered by graduate students in 2018 and 2019 at the Petrified Forest National Park in Arizona.
