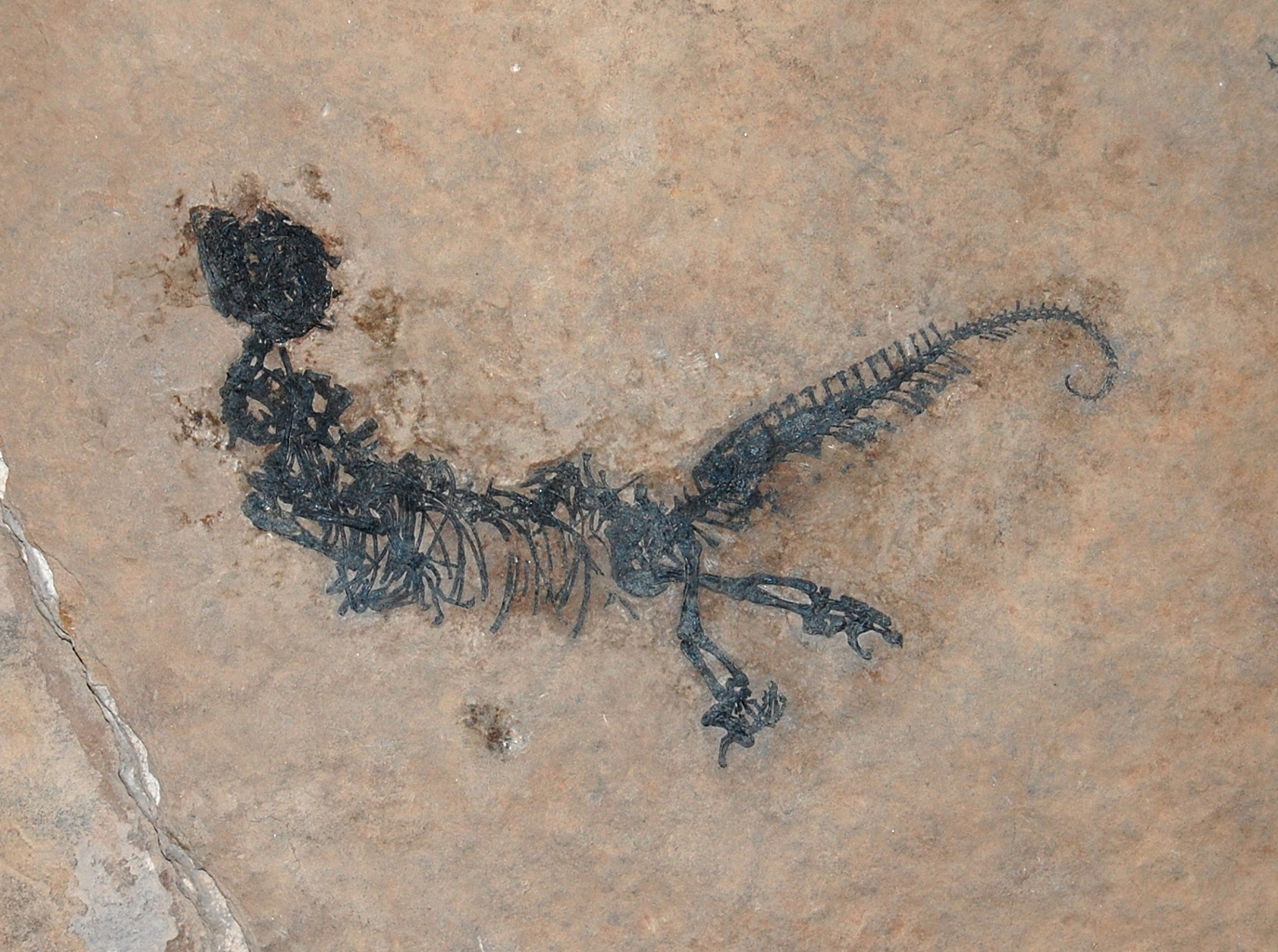
- Holotype specimen of Vallesaurus cenenis

Scientific classification
- Domain: Eukaryota
- Kingdom: Animalia
- Phylum: Chordata
- Class: Reptilia
- Clade: †Drepanosauromorpha
- Clade: †Elyurosauria
- Genus: †Vallesaurus; Renesto & Binelli, 2006

Species
- †V. cenensis Renesto & Binelli, 2006 (type); †V. zorzinensis Renesto et al., 2010

= Vallesaurus =

Vallesaurus Temporal range: Late Triassic, Norian

Extinct genus of reptiles

Vallesaurus is an extinct genus of Late Triassic elyurosaur drepanosauromorph. First found in Northern Italy in 1975, it is one of the most primitive drepanosaurs. V. cenenis is the type species, which was first mentioned in 1991 but only formally described in 2006. A second species, V. zorzinensis, was named in 2010.

== Discovery ==
The first specimen of Vallesaurus cenensis, MCSNB 4751, was found in 1975 by the staff of the Museo Civico di Scienze Naturali of Bergamo, Italy. The genus was named in respect of professor Valle, the former director of the museum. The species, on the other hand, was named after a local municipality called Cene, which was neighboring the site where the fossil was excavated. The specimen was given to palaeontologist Rupert Wild to study at the Staatliches Museum of Stuttgart, Germany. Wild briefly mentioned "Vallesaurus cenensis" in 1991, but without describing it formally or identifying the holotype specimen. Pinna (1993) listed the name when surveying Triassic reptiles in Italy, and identified MCSNB 4751 as its holotype. Renesto and Binelli formally described Vallesaurus cenensis in 2006, and attributed the name to Wild. However, Renesto et al. (2010) later attributed the name to Renesto & Binelli (2006), arguing that Vallesaurus cenensis was a nomen nudum prior to that study. A second species, V. zorzinensis, was found in the same location and identified from the specimen MCSNB 4783. Its specific name referred to the Zorzino Limestone Formation, where the holotype was found.

== Description ==
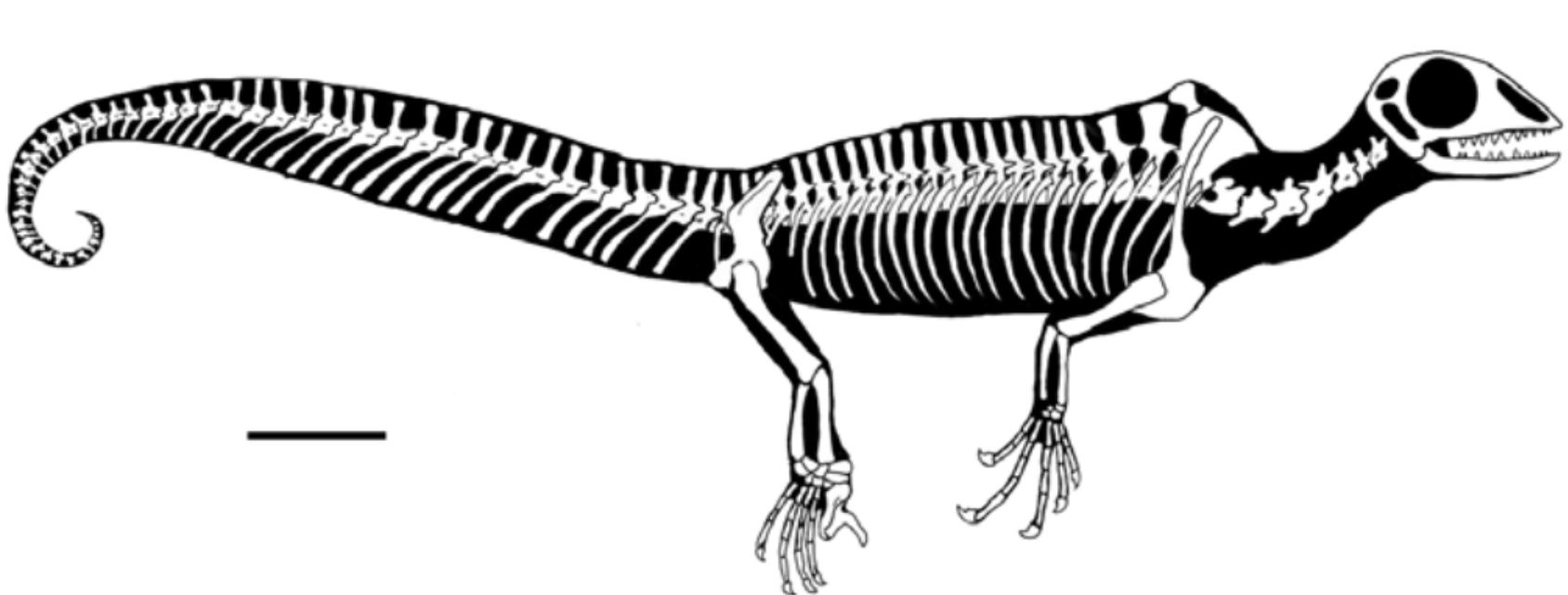
Skeletal diagram of Vallesaurus. Scale bar = 1 cm

Vallesaurus is a small drepanosaurid about 15 centimetres (5.9 in) long. The manus (hand) is pentadactyl, with the 4th digit being the longest and equal in length to the humerus. The tarsus (ankle) has a centrale which articulates with the tibia. In addition, the foot of Vallesaurus also has modified distal tarsals and metatarsals, and a clawless hallux.

Vallesaurus differs in some characteristics from another drepanosaur, Megalancosaurus. Vallesaurus has a proportionally shorter and higher snout, a thicker and larger maxilla and set of maxillary teeth, and a shorter cervical vertebra. It also lacks the fusion between the neural spines of the second and third dorsal vertebrae. Vallesaurus differs from Drepanosaurus, another drepanosaur, in that it lacks the enormous claw found on the second digit of the manus. It can be distinguished from Drepanosaurus, Megalancosaurus and possibly Dolabrosaurus in the lack of a terminal spine at the end of the tail. In addition, Vallesaurus also differs from Hypuronector, a related drepanosaur, in having anteroposteriorly extended neural spines of the anterior dorsal vertebrae and forelimbs much shorter than the hindlimbs.
