= Ancistronychus =

Ancistronychus Temporal range: Late Triassic ~Late Carnian

Scientific classification
- Kingdom: Animalia
- Phylum: Chordata
- Class: Reptilia
- Clade: †Drepanosauromorpha
- Clade: †Elyurosauria
- Family: †Drepanosauridae
- Genus: †Ancistronychus; Gonçalves & Sidor, 2019
- Species: †A. paradoxus

Binomial name
- †Ancistronychus paradoxus Gonçalves & Sidor, 2019

Extinct genus of reptiles

Ancistronychus is an extinct genus of drepanosauromorph from the Late Triassic Petrified Forest National Park in the Chinle Formation of Arizona. The type and only known species is Ancistronychus paradoxus, from Ancient Greek to mean "unexpected fishhook claw" due to its characteristic hooked shape. Ancistorhynchus is only known from a collection of isolated large claws from its second fingers, a distinctive trait of other derived drepanosaurs. Among drepanosauromorphs, Ancistorhynchus is distinguished by the strongly hooked shape of its claw, which is shorter in height and broader than those of Drepanosaurus, and is flat at its tip.

The claw of Ancistronychus is cleft at its tip, a trait found in living animals that use their claws for digging, such as moles and pangolins, by providing a larger attachment area for the keratin sheath of the claw. Likewise, functional analyses of its claws compared to other drepanosaurs and various living animals indicate that Ancistronychus used its large claw for digging underground, perhaps even for burrowing. The claws of Ancistronychus are most similar to those of the fellow drepanosauromorph Fabanychus, also known the Chinle Formation.
