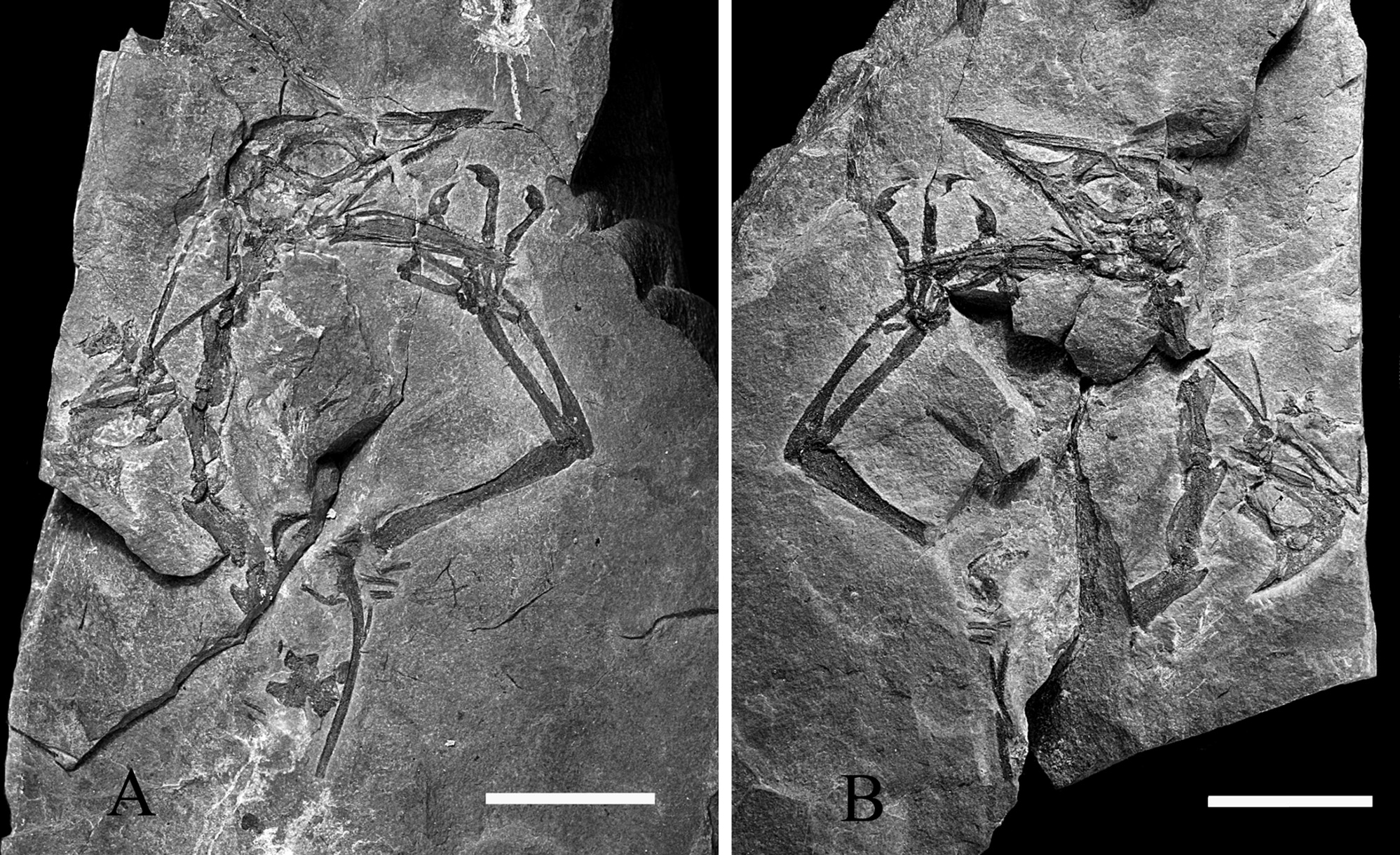
- Holotype fossil
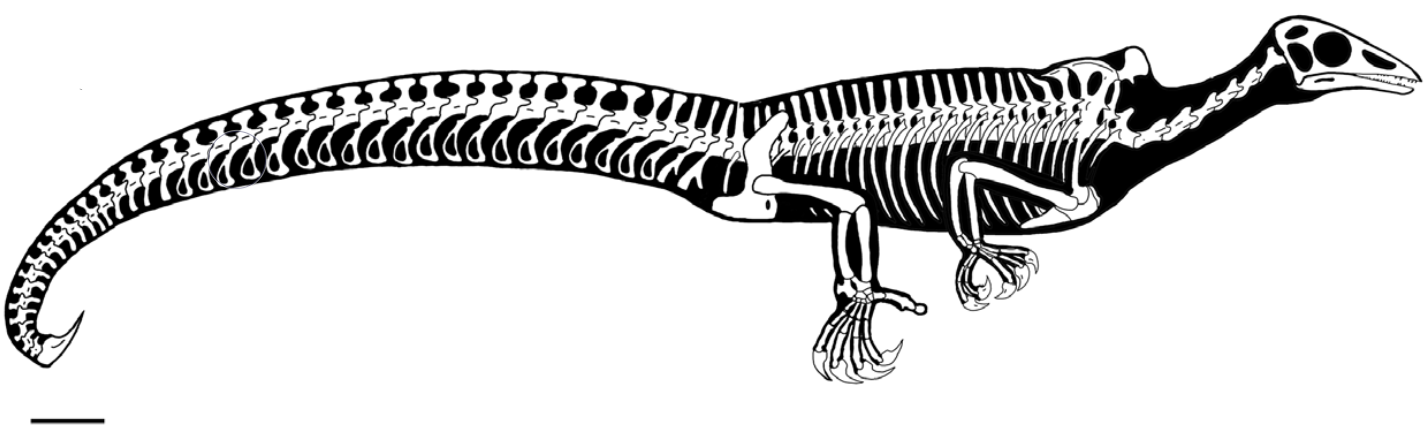
- Skeletal diagram, scale bar = 1 cm

Scientific classification
- Kingdom: Animalia
- Phylum: Chordata
- Class: Reptilia
- Clade: †Drepanosauromorpha
- Family: †Drepanosauridae
- Clade: †Megalancosaurinae
- Genus: †Megalancosaurus; Calzavara, Muscio & Wild 1981

Species
- M. preonensis Calzavara, Muscio & Wild 1981 (type); M. endennae Renesto et al. 2010

= Megalancosaurus =

Megalancosaurus Temporal range: Late Triassic ~215.56–212.0 Ma

Extinct genus of reptiles

Megalancosaurus is a genus of extinct sauropsid from the Late Triassic Dolomia di Forni Formation and Zorzino Limestone of northern Italy, and one of the best known drepanosaurids. The type species is M. preonensis; a translation of the animal's scientific name would be "long armed reptile from the Preone Valley."

== Anatomy ==
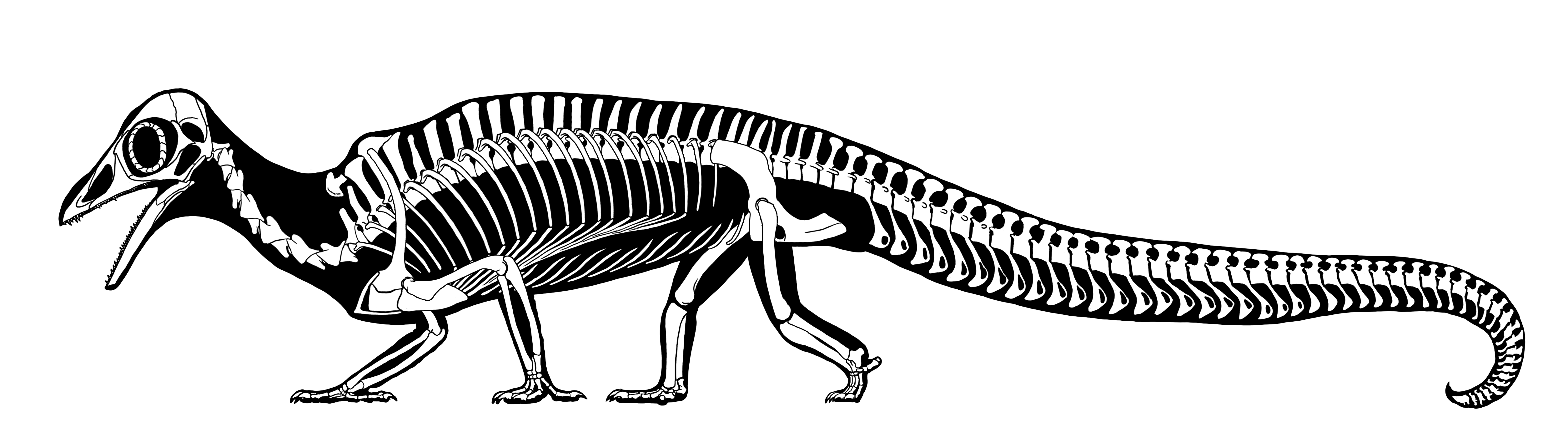
Skeletal diagram

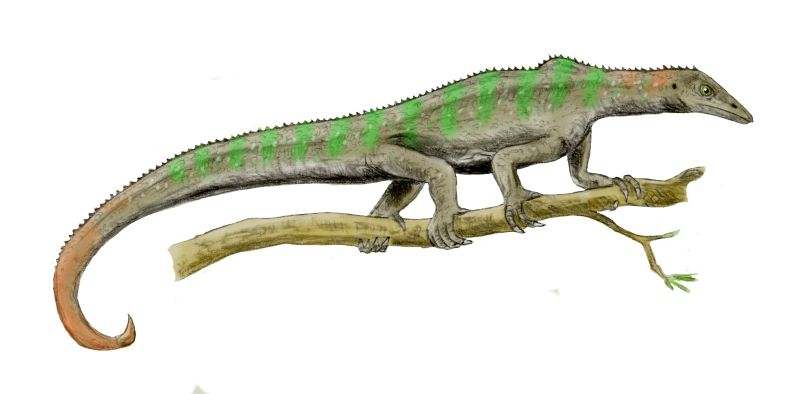
Artist's reconstruction of M. preonensis

Megalancosaurus was fairly small, its adult length was only about 25 centimeters (10 inches). It was built like a chameleon and probably lived a similar arboreal lifestyle, feeding on insects and other small animals. Even its feet were chameleon like, with two toes being opposed to the remaining three. The tail is long, prehensile, and bears a strange claw-like organ made of fused vertebrae at its end. Its shoulders formed a withers that would have served as an attachment site for especially strong muscles.

Some specimens have an opposable digit on the feet. Because not all members of the species appear to bear this digit, it has been speculated that it is an instance of sexual dimorphism, only being possessed by whichever sex needed a stronger grip on the branch during copulation.

The head of Megalancosaurus is superficially very birdlike. The skull was roughly 30 mm long and 12 mm tall. The eyes were large and the snout was narrow. Towards the tip of the snout were two small premaxillary teeth, which were separated by a diastema from at least 22 small maxillary teeth. The orbits were directed anteriorly, suggesting that Megalancosaurus had good binocular vision.

== Palaeobiology ==
Megalancosaurus is theorised to have been an ambush predator that assumed a stable, tripodal posture made possible by its hooked tail and hindlimbs and used its forelimb digits, which resembled pincers, to grasp prey.

It has been proposed that Megalancosaurus was capable of gliding, though while not fully ruled out it has largely been dismissed.

The two species of Megalancosaurus were able to coexist by living in different microhabitats such that they did not occupy the same niche.

== History ==
Megalancosaurus preonensis was first described in 1980. Its discoverers interpreted it as an archosaur, based in part on the belief that it had an antorbital fenestra. In 1994, two specimens originally thought to be juveniles of Drepanosaurus were assigned to the species. This discovery led to the realization that it was a drepanosaurid. Since then, it has been regarded as one of the most derived members of the group.

== Related genera ==
- Dolabrosaurus
- Drepanosaurus
- Hypuronector
- Vallesaurus
