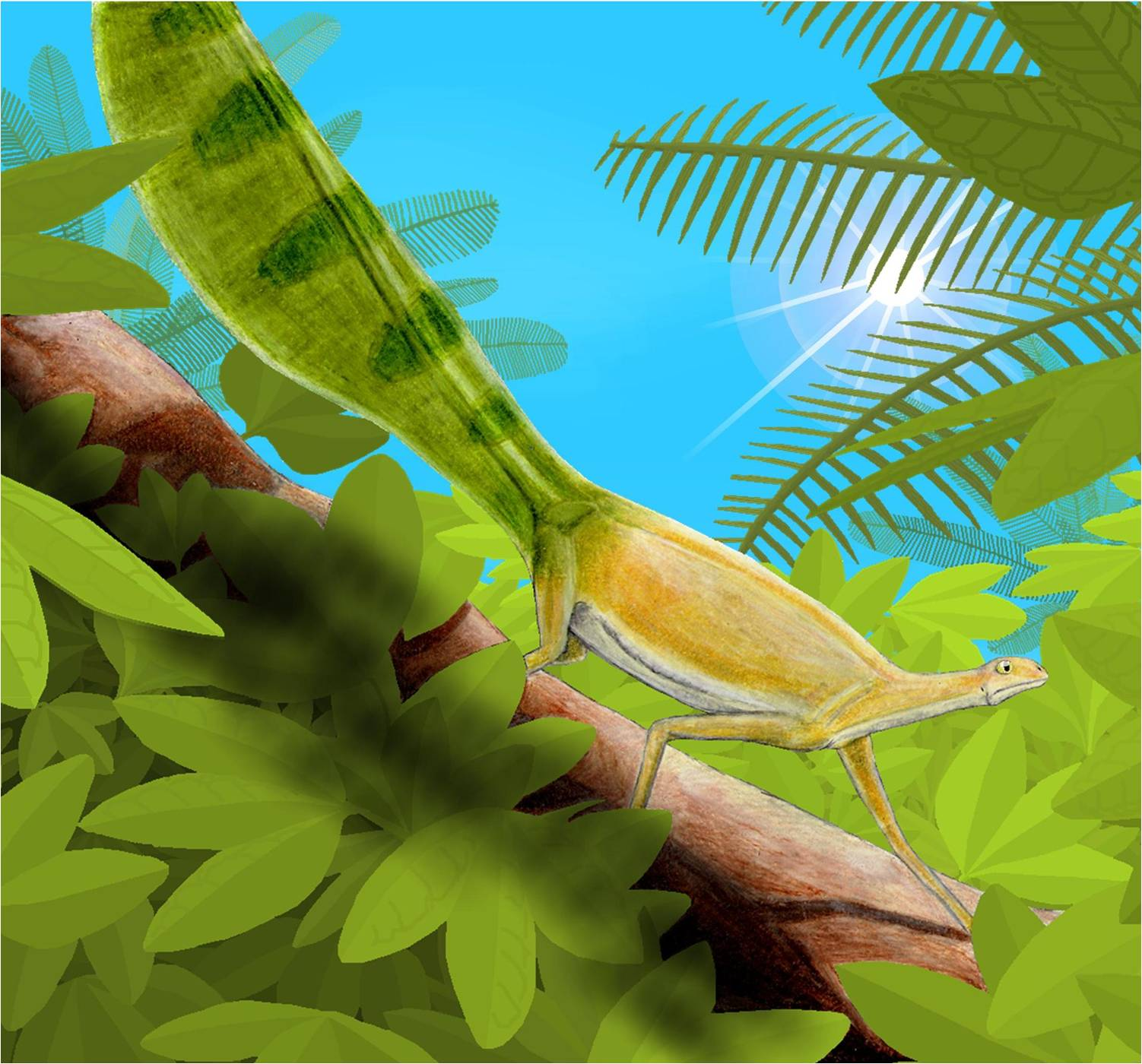
- Live restoration as an arboreal reptile
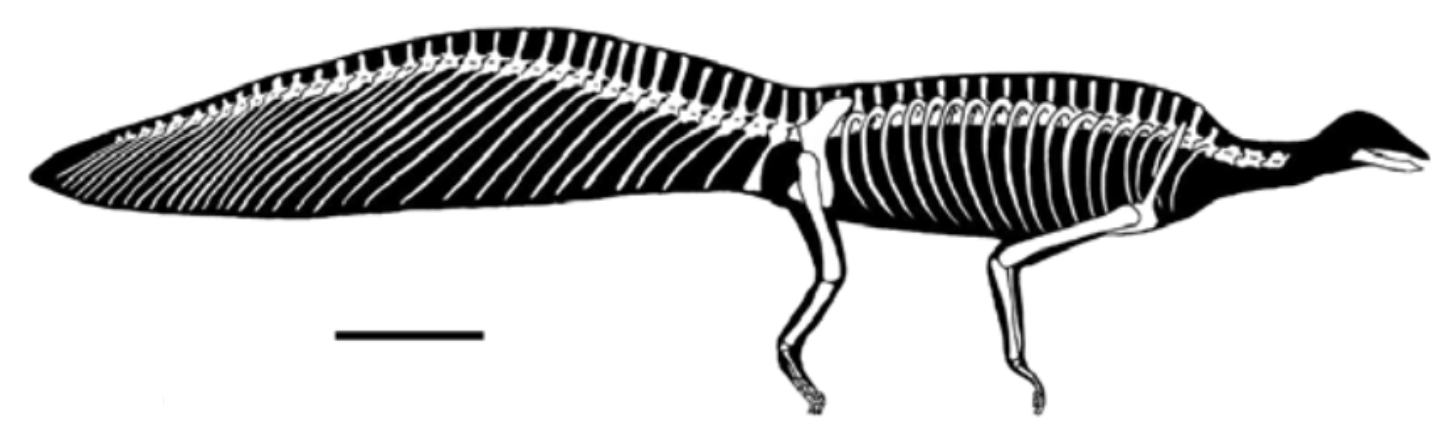
- Skeletal diagram. Scale bar = 1 cm

Scientific classification
- Domain: Eukaryota
- Kingdom: Animalia
- Phylum: Chordata
- Class: Reptilia
- Clade: †Drepanosauromorpha
- Family: †Drepanosauridae
- Genus: †Hypuronector; Colbert & Olsen, 2001
- Species: †H. limnaios

Binomial name
- †Hypuronector limnaios Colbert & Olsen, 2001

= Hypuronector =

Hypuronector Temporal range: Late Triassic, 221.5–205.6 Ma

Extinct genus of reptiles

Hypuronector is a genus of extinct drepanosaur reptile from the Late Triassic Lockatong Formation of New Jersey. The etymology of the name translates as "deep-tailed swimmer from the lake", in reference to its assumed aquatic habits hypothesized by its discoverers. Hypuronector was related to the arboreal Megalancosaurus. It was a small animal, estimated to be only 12 cm (4.7 in) long in life. So far dozens of specimens of Hypuronector are known, though scientists have not found any complete skeletons. This makes attempts to reconstruct Hypuronector's body or lifestyle highly speculative and controversial.

== Paleobiology ==
Despite their evolutionary relationship, it has been suggested by some scientists that Hypuronector may have had a different ecological niche than other drepanosaurs. It has long been accepted that Megalancosaurus was an arboreal chameleon-like animal. Hypuronector has inversely been suggested to be aquatic due to its deep, paddle-like tail and the fact that its remains were found in an ancient lake bottom. However, several studies on its limb morphology, as well as the rather delicate tail vertebrae without evidence of extensive caudal musculature, rule out an aquatic hypothesis, and it was likely arboreal like other drepanosaurs.

Perhaps more extremely, it has been suggested to be a glider or flyer, due to the limb proportions, particularly the elongated forelimbs. These are consistent with an animal with patagia, like a flying squirrel.

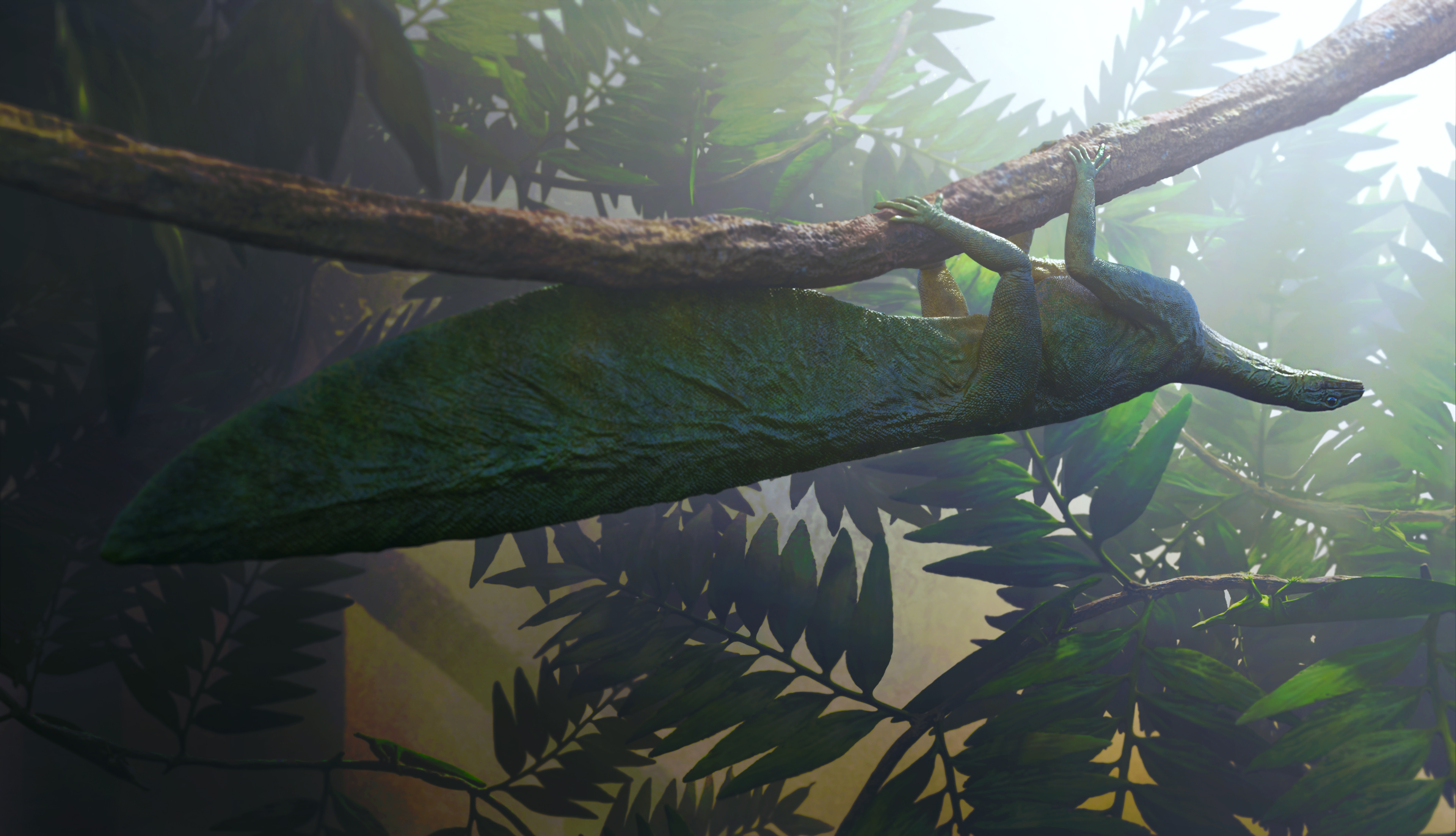
Hypuronector reconstruction
