= Dolabrosaurus =

Dolabrosaurus Temporal range: Norian ~221.5–205.6 Ma

Scientific classification
- Kingdom: Animalia
- Phylum: Chordata
- Class: Reptilia
- Clade: †Drepanosauromorpha
- Family: †Drepanosauridae
- Genus: †Dolabrosaurus; Berman & Reisz, 1992
- Species: †D. aquatilis

Binomial name
- †Dolabrosaurus aquatilis Berman & Reisz, 1992

Extinct genus of reptiles

Dolabrosaurus is a genus of extinct reptile and a member of the family Drepanosauridae. Fossils of Dolabrosaurus have been found in the Chinle Formation of New Mexico.
