= 2024 in reptile paleontology =

This list of fossil reptiles described in 2024 is a list of new taxa of fossil reptiles that were described during the year 2024, as well as other significant discoveries and events related to reptile paleontology that occurred in 2024.

== Squamates ==
| Name | Novelty | Status | Authors | Age | Type locality | Country | Notes | Images |
|---|---|---|---|---|---|---|---|---|
| Carinodens acrodon | Sp. nov | Valid | Longrich et al. | Late Cretaceous (Maastrichtian) | Ouled Abdoun Basin | Morocco | | |
| Cryptobicuspidon | Gen. et sp. nov | In press | Carvalho & Santucci | Early Cretaceous (Aptian) | Quiricó Formation | Brazil | A member of Polyglyphanodontia. The type species is C. pachysymphysealis. Announced in 2023; the final article version will be published in 2024. | |
| Electroscincus | Gen. et sp. nov | Valid | Daza et al. | Cretaceous (Albian/Cenomanian) | Burmese amber | Myanmar | A skink. The type species is E. zedi. | |
| Halisaurus hebae | Sp. nov | In press | Shaker et al. | Late Cretaceous (Maastrichtian) | Dakhla Formation | Egypt | A mosasaur belonging to the subfamily Halisaurinae. Announced in 2023; the final article version will be published in 2024. | |
| Hibernophis | Gen. et sp. nov | | Croghan et al. | Oligocene (Rupelian) | White River Formation | United States (Wyoming) | A member of Booidea of uncertain affinities. The type species is H. breithaupti. | |
| Khinjaria | Gen. et sp. nov | In press | Longrich et al. | Late Cretaceous (Maastrichtian) | Ouled Abdoun Basin | Morocco | A mosasaur belonging to the subfamily Plioplatecarpinae. The type species is K. acuta. | |
| Segurasaurus | Gen. et comb. nov | | Berrocal-Casero et al. | Late Cretaceous (Cenomanian) | Tentúgal Formation | Portugal | A member of Pythonomorpha. The type species is "Carentonosaurus" soaresi. | |
| Terastiodontosaurus | Gen. et sp. nov | Valid | Georgalis & Smith in Georgalis et al. | Eocene (Ypresian-Lutetian) | | Tunisia | An amphisbaenian in the family Trogonophidae. The type species is T. marcelosanchezi. | |
| Vasuki | Gen. et sp. nov | Valid | Datta & Bajpai | Middle Eocene (Lutetian) | Naredi Formation | India | A member of Madtsoiidae. The type species is V. indicus. | |
| Yaguarasaurus regiomontanus | Sp. nov | Valid | Rivera-Sylva et al. | Late Cretaceous (Turonian-Coniacian) | Agua Nueva Formation | Mexico | A mosasaur belonging to the subfamily Plioplatecarpinae. Announced in 2023; the final article version was published in 2024. | |

=== Squamate research ===
- A study on the biogeography of squamates throughout their evolutionary history, providing evidence of a localized Pangaean origin (Africa, Australia, Eurasia and Sunda) of the squamate crown group in the Jurassic followed by strong regionalization to Eurasia for subsequent Jurassic lineages, is published by Wilenzik, Barger & Pyron (2024).
- New lizard assemblage, including fossil material of a pleurodontan iguanian, a teiioid and a possible scincoid, is described from the Upper Cretaceous (Campanian-Maastrichtian) Allen Formation (Argentina) by Garberoglio et al. (2024).
- Revision of the fossil material of Paleocene lizards from the Walbeck fissure filling (Saxony-Anhalt, Germany) is published by Čerňanský & Vasilyan (2024), who interpret Camptognathosaurus parisiensis as a junior synonym of Glyptosaurus walbeckensis, resulting in a new combination Camptognathosaurus walbeckensis, tentatively assign C. walbeckensis to the family Lacertidae, and interpret fossils of Parasauromalus paleocenicus as belonging to an indeterminate lacertid.
- Čerňanský (2024) describes probable fossil material of the European green lizard from the Węże I locality in Poland, providing evidence of large geographic distribution of green lizards in Europe during the Pliocene.
- Fossil material of the oldest European member of the genus Eremias reported to date is described from the Pleistocene strata from the Taurida cave (Crimea) by Syromyatnikova & Tarasova (2024).
- An iguanian skull from the Paleogene White River Formation (Wyoming, United States), tentatively assigned to the species Aciprion formosum, is interpreted as the oldest and first definitive stem member of Crotaphytidae by Scarpetta (2024); the author also interprets Polrussia mongoliensis as possible member of the crown group of Pleurodonta, Magnuviator ovimonsensis as a possible stem pleurodontan and Afairiguana avius as a possible anole.
- De Queiroz et al. (2024) describe a probable juvenile anole specimen from the Dominican amber, and identify it as a trunk anole likely related to extant Anolis distichus.
- An anole tail, possibly belonging to a specimen of Anolis electrum, is described from the Miocene Mexican amber by De Queiroz et al. (2024).
- A study on frontals and maxillae of extant agamids from Australia and Papua New Guinea, and on the utility of these bones for identification of agamid taxa in the fossil record, is published by Ramm et al. (2024), who report that the studied bones diagnostic at the generic level and might provide information on the ecology of fossil agamids, but also that the studies relying on these elements would likely underestimate agamid species diversity.
- Čerňanský et al. (2024) describe glyptosaurid, palaeovaranid and varanid fossils from the earliest Eocene strata from the Dormaal site (Belgium) and transfer ?Placosaurus ragei to the glyptosaurid genus Gaultia, representing the first record of this genus outside North America.
- Revision of the fossil material and a study on the affinities of Pseudopus pannonicus is published by Loréal, Georgalis & Čerňanský (2024), who interpret the majority of large anguids from the Neogene of Europe as junior synonyms of P. pannonicus.
- Donato et al. (2024) identify skull remains of a Middle Pleistocene monitor lizard from Naracoorte's Fossil Chamber (Victoria Fossil Cave, Australia) as fossil material of the lace monitor.
- Garzon et al. (2024) describe an incomplete maxilla from the Turonian to Coniacian Middle Napo Formation of the Napo Group, representing the first finding of a mosasaurid from the Upper Cretaceous strata from Ecuador.
- Allemand et al. (2024) present reconstructions of brain endocasts of three specimens of Tethysaurus nopcsai, providing evidence of different endocranial organizations in Tethysaurus, Platecarpus and Clidastes, and find no evidence of closer endocranial resemblance of Tethysaurus to monitor lizards than other toxicoferans.
- Páramo-Fonseca et al. (2024) describe well-preserved chondrocranial elements of a mosasaur specimen from the Coniacian Galembo Formation (Colombia), indicating that chondrocranium of mosasaurs was more reduced than in most lizards, but not as severely as in snakes and amphisbaenians, and that its reduction might have been related to the modification of limbs by adaptation to aquatic life.
- The oldest fossil material of Platecarpus from Europe reported to date, as well as fossil material of Tylosaurus sp, is described from the Santonian localities in the Sougraigne area (Aude Department, France) by Plasse et al. (2024).
- Grigoriev, Zverkov & Nikiforov (2024) describe mosasaur remains from the Campanian strata from the Izhberda locality, including the first records of members of the subfamilies Tylosaurinae (including Taniwhasaurus, expanding known geographical range of the genus), Mosasaurinae and Plioplatecarpinae from the Upper Cretaceous strata from the Orenburg Oblast (Russia).
- Rempert, Martens & Vinkeles Melchers (2024) describe new fossil material of mosasaurs from the Upper Cretaceous strata in Mississippi (United States), providing evidence of the presence of Mosasaurus hoffmannii during the Maastrichtian and of cf. Platecarpus, an unnamed species of Plioplatecarpus from the Demopolis Chalk and probably of Tylosaurus sp. during the Campanian.
- A study on a skull of a specimen of Plioplatecarpus from the Campanian Bearpaw Shale (Alberta, Canada) preserved with a scleral ring is published by Holmes (2024), who interprets Plioplatecarpus as having a stereoscopic vision and capable of tracking quickly moving objects in light-poor conditions.
- Sharpe, Powers & Caldwell (2024) consider Xenodens calminechari to be nomen dubium, and interpret its type material as subjected to a forgery.
- López-Rueda et al. (2024) describe new mosasaur material from the Upper Cretaceous Labor-Tierna and Plaeners formations (Colombia), including the first record of a member of the genus Globidens from northern South America reported to date.
- Rempert, Martens & Vinkeles Melchers (2024) report the discovery of new mosasaur material from the Maastrichtian Peedee Formation (North Carolina, United States), including fossils of members of species associated with the northern and southern margin of the Mediterranean Tethys (Prognathodon cf. solvayi and Mosasaurus cf. beaugei), extending their known geographical range.
- Aniny et al. (2024) describe a trunk vertebra of Palaeophis cf. africanus from the Eocene deposits of the El Breij Depression (Western Sahara), expanding known geographical range of the species.
- Natarajan et al. (2024) describe new fossil material of Pterosphenus schucherti from the Eocene (Bartonian) Harudi Formation (India), and interpret the species P. biswasi and P. schweinfurthi as junior synonyms of P. schucherti.
- Garberoglio, Gómez & Caldwell (2024) describe fossil material of a large-bodied (estimated to be around 8 meters in total length) snake distinct from Titanoboa from the Paleocene Cerrejón Formation (Colombia) interpreted by the authors as an undetermined palaeophiine.
- Flores et al. (2024) describe remains of a snake belonging to the genus Lampropeltis from the probable Pleistocene strata from the McFaddin Beach (Texas, United States), providing the first evidence of presence of members of this genus on the Texan coast in the Pleistocene.
- Villa et al. (2024) describe vertebrae of indeterminate cobras from middle–late Miocene localities in the Vallès-Penedès Basin (Catalonia, Spain), providing evidence of presence of cobras in the Iberian Peninsula before the Messinian salinity crisis.
- The first known snake assemblage from early Clarendonian in North America is reported from the Penny Creek Local Fauna (Ash Hollow Formation; Nebraska, United States) by Jacisin & Lawing (2024), who interpret the studied fossils as indicative of a woodland-prairie environment with a permanent stream or river as a local water source.
- ElShafie (2024) presents novel methods which can be used to determine body size from isolated lizard bones and applies these methods to a sample of lizard bones from the Paleogene of North America.
- Ledesma et al. (2024) revise fossil material of late Pleistocene and Holocene lizards from Hall's Cave (Texas, United States), adding five new taxa to the known diversity of the cave fauna, and establish a procedure for making well-supported identifications for North American lizard fossils.
- Richter et al. (2024) report Late Pleistocene (~15.4 ± 1.14 ka and ~13.2 ± 1.14 ka respectively) fossils identifiable as Phrynosoma Cf. P. douglasii from the Coyote Canyon Mammoth Site, Benton County, Washington. These are the first confirmed Phrynosoma "horned toad" fossils identified from the Pacific Northwest.

== Ichthyosauromorphs ==
| Name | Novelty | Status | Authors | Age | Type locality | Country | Notes | Images |
|---|---|---|---|---|---|---|---|---|
| Argovisaurus | Gen. et sp. nov | | Miedema et al. | Middle Jurassic (Bajocian-Bathonian) | Hauptrogenstein Formation | Switzerland | An ichthyosaur closely related to Ophthalmosauria. The type species is A. martafernandezi. | |
| Ichthyotitan | Gen. et sp. nov | Valid | Lomax et al. | Late Triassic (Rhaetian) | Westbury Formation | United Kingdom | Possibly a member of the family Shastasauridae. The type species is I. severnensis. | |
| Mixosaurus luxiensis | Sp. nov | Valid | Fang, Wolniewicz & Liu | Middle Triassic (Anisian) | Guanling Formation | China | | |
| Platypterygius elsuntuoso | Sp. nov | | Fonseca, Cabra, & Camacho | Early Cretaceous (Barremian) | Paja Formation | Colombia | | |

=== Ichthyosauromorph research ===
- Liu, Wu & Qiao (2024) describe a new hupehsuchian specimen from the Lower Triassic strata in South China, identified as a new morphotype of Nanchangosaurus and preserving the first known fossil material of palate, zeugopodium and autopodium of Nanchangosaurus.
- Evidence from experiments with soft robotic models, indicative of a direct correlation between fin shape and the pitch torque generated while swimming in ichthyosauriforms, is presented by Sprumont et al. (2024).
- Ye et al. (2024) reevaluate the age of Thaisaurus chonglakmanii, interpreting it as a late Spathian taxon.
- Gu, Wolniewicz & Liu (2024) describe a new specimen of Chaohusaurus zhangjiawanensis, providing new information on the dentition of this species, interpreted as indicating that C. zhangjiawanensis was likely capable of feeding on harder and larger prey than C. brevifemoralis and C. chaoxianensis.
- A study on bone arrangement in ichthyosaur fins throughout their evolutionary history, providing evidence of the presence of a broad array of connectivity patterns, is published by Fernández et al. (2024).
- Sander et al. (2024) describe vertebrae of a member of the genus Cymbospondylus from the Olenekian Vikinghøgda Formation (Svalbard, Norway), interpreted as likely belonging to an animal with a total length between 7.5 m and 9.5 m.
- Fossil material of medium- to large-sized probable ichthyopterygians is described from the Anisian strata in South Primorye (Russia) by Zakharov et al. (2024).
- Redescription of the anatomy of the postcranial skeleton of Besanosaurus leptorhynchus is published by Bindellini et al. (2024), who interpret this taxon as having body profile and swimming style intermediate between anguilliform swimmers such as Cymbospondylus and shastasaur-grade ichthyosaurs.
- Putative bone fragments of large-bodied dinosaurs from Rhaetian strata in France, Germany and United Kingdom are reinterpreted as fossil material of large-bodied ichthyosaurs by Perillo & Sander (2024).
- Eustache et al. (2024) report evidence of preservation of cellular activity, bone fibrils, Sharpey fibers and cartilage fibers in ichthyosaur specimens from the Jurassic strata in France and the United Kingdom, but find no evidence of collagen preservation in the studied specimens.
- Description of Early Jurassic ichthyosaur specimens from the collection of fossils amassed by Charles Moore is published by Massare et al. (2024).
- Description of the skeletal anatomy (including the first record of an open medullary cavity on the ribs of an Early Jurassic ichthyosaur) and soft tissues of an immature ichthyosaur specimen (possibly a member of the genus Stenopterygius) from the Toarcian strata of the "Schistes Carton" unit (Luxembourg) is published by Bonnevier Wallstedt et al. (2024), who also study the taphonomy of the specimen.
- Campos et al. (2024) redescribe the holotype of Myobradypterygius hauthali, interpreting this species as phylogenetically distant from species belonging to the genus Platypterygius, and consider Myobradypterygius to be a distinct genus.
- Pardo-Pérez et al. (2024) describe new fossil material of Myobradypterygius hauthali from the Hauterivian strata in the Torres del Paine National Park (Chile), expanding known distribution of the species and providing evidence of anatomical differences between M. hauthali and Platypterygius platydactylus supporting the classification of Myobradypterygius as a distinct genus; the authors also describe fossil material of a member of the subfamily Ophthalmosaurinae from the same locality, representing the southernmost record of the subfamily reported to date.
- Yakupova & Akhmedenov (2024) describe fossil material of a member of the genus Platypterygius from the Albian strata from the Mangystau region (Kazakhstan).
- Young et al. (2024) describe fossil material of a platypterygiid (probably more closely related to Platypterygius australis than to the Cretaceous ichthyosaurs from western Gondwana) from the Cenomanian strata of the Swale Member of the Split Rock Formation (New Zealand).
- Meyerkort et al. (2024) describe a phalanx bone of a brachypterygiid ichthyosaur from the middle–upper Cenomanian strata of the Gearle Siltstone (Australia), representing the geologically youngest ichthyosaur record from the Southern Hemisphere reported to date.
- Review of the fossil record of ichthyosaurs from Switzerland is published by Klug et al. (2024).

== Sauropterygians ==
| Name | Novelty | Status | Authors | Age | Type locality | Country | Notes | Images |
|---|---|---|---|---|---|---|---|---|
| Dianmeisaurus mutaensis | Sp. nov | | Hu, Li, & Liu | Middle Triassic (Anisian) | Guanling Formation | China | A pachypleurosaur. | |
| Franconiasaurus | Gen. et sp. nov | Valid | Sachs, Eggmaier & Madzia | Early Jurassic (Toarcian) | Jurensismergel Formation | Germany | A basal plesiosauroid. The type species is F. brevispinus. | |
| Marambionectes | Gen. et sp. nov | | O'Gorman et al. | Late Cretaceous (Maastrichtian) | López de Bertodano Formation | Antarctica | An elasmosaurid. The type species is M. molinai. | |
| Martinectes | Gen. et comb. nov | In press | Clark, O'Keefe, & Slack | Late Cretaceous (Campanian) | Pierre Shale | United States (Wyoming, South Dakota) | A polycotylid. The type species is "Dolichorhynchops" bonneri. Announced in 2023; the final article version will be published in 2024. | |
| Scalamagnus | Gen. et comb. nov | In press | Clark, O'Keefe, & Slack | Late Cretaceous (Turonian) | Tropic Shale | United States (Utah) | A polycotylid. The type species is "Dolichorhynchops" tropicensis. Announced in 2023; the final article version will be published in 2024. | |
| Unktaheela | Gen. et sp. nov | In press | Clark, O'Keefe, & Slack | Late Cretaceous (Campanian) | Sharon Springs Formation | United States (Wyoming, South Dakota) | A polycotylid. The type species is U. specta. Announced in 2023; the final article version will be published in 2024. | |

=== Sauropterygian research ===
- A study on tooth wear patterns in Middle and Late Triassic placodonts from Europe, interpreted as suggestive of different diet composition of the studied placodonts (with some taxa unlikely to feed solely on hard-shelled animals), is published by Gere et al. (2024).
- Kear et al. (2024) describe a nothosaur vertebra from the Anisian Balmacaan Formation (New Zealand), representing the oldest sauropterygian record from the Southern Hemisphere reported to date.
- The first simosaurid fossil material from Egypt reported to date is described from the Middle Triassic Saharonim Formation by Cabezuelo-Hernández, De Miguel Chaves & Pérez-García (2024).
- Description of the anatomy of the postcranial skeleton of Paludidraco multidentatus is published by Cabezuelo-Hernández et al. (2024).
- New fossil material of plesiosaurs, including the first reliably identified early Pliensbachian pliosaurid reported to date, is described from Pliensbachian strata from Werther and Bielefeld-Sudbrack localities (North Rhine-Westphalia, Germany) by Sachs, Hornung & Madzia (2024).
- A study on the tooth replacement in Maresaurus coccai, and on its implications for reconstructions of changes of the tooth replacement cycle period of plesiosaurs throughout their evolutionary history, is published by Matelo Mirco, O'Gorman & Gasparini (2024).
- Vincent et al. (2024) describe a new specimen of Liopleurodon ferox from the Middle Jurassic (Callovian) from the Grève Quarry (Vienne, France), and interpret its anatomy as confirming that the lack of fusion between centra and neural arches of the cervical vertebrae is not a trait exclusive to juvenile pliosaurids, and might also be a paedomorphic feature of adult specimens.
- Delsett et al. (2024) describe fossil material of a member of the genus Colymbosaurus from the Lower Cretaceous (Berriasian-Valanginian) strata of the Sverdrup Basin (Ellesmere Island, Nunavut, Canada), expanding known geographical range of this genus and providing evidence that members of this genus survived the Jurassic-Cretaceous transition.
- Alhalabi et al. (2024) describe fossil material of an elasmosaurid from the Coniacian-Santonian Rmah Formation (Syria), representing the most complete plesiosaur specimen from the Middle East reported to date and likely the oldest Cretaceous plesiosaur from the Middle East.
- A study on the histology of the vertebrae of Vegasaurus molyi from different sections of the vertebral column is published by Talevi, Garat & Fernández (2024).
- O'Gorman (2024) studies the neck elongation pattern in Elasmosaurus platyurus, taking the taphonomic distortion into account, and presents a new scheme of neck elongation patterns in plesiosaurs with a long neck and small skull.
- Zverkov et al. (2024) redescribe Polycotylus sopozkoi and confirm its status as a distinct species within the genus Polycotylus.
- Henderson (2024) provides estimates of the original masses and shape characteristics of incompletely preserved gastroliths found with Cretaceous plesiosaur specimens from Alberta (Canada), and interprets the estimated amounts of gastroliths as unlikely to work effectively as ballast.
- A study on swimming patterns of plesiosaurs, based on experiments with a robotic model, is published by Fukuhara et al. (2024).

== Turtles ==
| Name | Novelty | Status | Authors | Age | Type locality | Country | Notes | Images |
|---|---|---|---|---|---|---|---|---|
| Anosteira crowcreekensis | Sp. nov | Valid | Hutchison & Westgate | Eocene | Jackson Group | United States (Arkansas) | | |
| Baalemys | Gen. et sp. nov | | Sarda & Maniel | Late Cretaceous | Portezuelo Formation | Argentina | A member of the family Chelidae. The type species is B. mansillai. | |
| Chelydropsis heweneggensis | Sp. nov | | Pappa et al. | Miocene | | Germany | | |
| Chersina langebaanwegi | Sp. nov | | Delfino et al. | Pliocene | Langebaanweg fossil site | South Africa | A tortoise, a species of Chersina. | |
| Elseya camfieldensis | Sp. nov | Valid | Joseph-Ouni, Yayes & McCord | Miocene | | Australia | A species of Elseya. | |
| Elseya mudburra | Sp. nov | Valid | Joseph-Ouni, Yayes & McCord | Miocene | | Australia | A species of Elseya. | |
| Iaremys | Gen. et sp. nov | | Agnolín, Aranciaga-Rolando & Ortiz | Late Cretaceous (Maastrichtian) | Allen Formation | Argentina | A member of the family Chelidae. The type species is I. batrachomorpha. | |
| Lusochelys | Gen. et. sp. nov | Valid | Pérez-García & Antunes | Middle Miocene | Lisbon Miocene series | Portugal | A pancheloniid turtle. The type species is L. emilianoi | |
| Peltocephalus maturin | Sp. nov | Valid | Ferreira et al. | Late Pleistocene-Early Holocene | Rio Madeira Formation | Brazil | A podocnemidid turtle. A giant extinct species of Peltocephalus, represented today only by P. dumerilianus. | |
| Protrachyaspis | Gen. et sp. nov | Valid | Zvonok, Panteleev & Danilov | Eocene (Bartonian) | Shorym Formation | Kazakhstan | A pan-cheloniid. The type species is P. shorymensis. | |
| Xianyuechelys | Gen. et sp. nov | Valid | Ke et al. | Late Cretaceous (Maastrichtian) | Lianhe Formation | China | A member of the family Nanhsiungchelyidae. The type species is X. yingliangi. | |

=== Turtle research ===
- Pereira et al. (2024) provide evidence of two peaks in extinction rates in the evolutionary history of turtles, with the first peak coinciding with the Cretaceous-Paleogene transition, and the second one (possibly caused by hominin activities) beginning in and continuing since the Pliocene.
- Vlachos (2024) reports that the diversity of turtles was already in decline before the Cretaceous–Paleogene extinction event, and continued to drop during the Danian.
- A study on the osteological variation among the humeri of extant turtles, Proganochelys quenstedtii, Proterochersis porebensis and Palaeochersis talampayensis is published by Hermanson et al. (2024).
- A study on shells of Proganochelys and Proterochersis is published by Ferreira et al. (2024), who interpret their findings as indicating that the main function of the attachment of turtle pelvis to the shell was not strengthening of the shell, and interpret Proterochersis as likely aquatic.
- Redescription of the anatomy of the skull of Heckerochelys romani is published by Obraztsova, Sukhanov & Danilov (2024).
- A study on the biomechanical performance of the skull Niolamia argentina of is published by Degrange et al. (2024), who interpret the frill and horns of N. argentina as more likely used for display than for combat.
- Sterli et al. (2024) describe fossil material of a new turtle taxon from the Cenomanian Piedra Clavada Formation (Argentina), with a distinctive morphology indicating that it belongs to a previously unrecognized lineage of turtles, and representing the oldest Late Cretaceous turtle from the southernmost part of South America reported to date.
- Tong et al. (2024) describe new shell material of Phunoichelys thirakhupti and Kalasinemys prasarttongosothi from the Phu Noi site (Thailand), providing new information on the anatomy of the studied turtles.
- Pérez-García & Rubio (2024) describe a carapace of Algorachelus cf. peregrina from the Albian or Cenomanian Boundary Marls Unit of the Utrillas Group (Spain), representing the oldest bothremydid from Laurasia reported to date.
- Cadena et al. (2024) describe new fossil material of Puentemys mushaisaensis from the Paleogene Arcillolitas de Socha Formation (Boyacá Department, Colombia), expanding known geographical range of the species, and interpret its presence in both Arcillolitas de Socha Formation and the Cerrejón Coal Mine as indicative of connectivity of coastal and inland ecosystems in northern South America during the late Paleocene to early Eocene.
- Sena et al. (2024) study the microstructure of shells of Bauruemys elegans and other members of Pelomedusoides from the Upper Cretaceous and Paleogene strata in southern Brazil, and interpret their findings as consistent with an aquatic to semi-aquatic lifestyle of the studied turtles, as well as supporting the interpretation of the turtle carapace as originating endoskeletally from ribs and vertebral arches.
- Maniel (2024) describes fossil material of members of Podocnemidoidea from the Santonian Bajo de la Carpa Formation (Argentina), preserving a scute scheme different from those of other turtles from the studied formation, and revises the diversity of Pelomedusoides from the Upper Cretaceous Neuquén Group, finding evidence for three different stages of their evolution (the appearance of Bothremydidae in the Cenomanian, their coexistence with Podocnemidoidea from the late Turonian to the Coniacian, and the continued existence and diversification of Podocnemidoidea from the Santonian to the late Campanian).
- New information on the shell anatomy of Neochelys zamorensis is presented by Pérez-García et al. (2024).
- Pérez-García, Camilo & Ortega (2024) describe new fossil material of Selenemys lusitanica from the Upper Jurassic Bombarral and Sobral formations (Portugal), providing new information on the shell anatomy of this turtle.
- Spicher, Lyson & Evers (2024) redescribe the anatomy of the skull of Saxochelys gilberti.
- A study on the anatomy of the skull of Australobaena chilensis is published by Karl, Safi & Tichy (2024).
- Tong et al. (2024) describe carapaces of members of the genus Nanhsiungchelys from the Upper Cretaceous of Ganzhou Basin (Jiangxi, China), extending known geographical distribution of the genus and providing new information on the morphology of its carapace.
- Ke et al. (2024) describe fossil material of a member of the genus Nanhsiungchelys from the Upper Cretaceous of Ganzhou Basin (China) and reevaluate the holotype of N. yangi, providing evidence that the plastron of members of the genus Nanhsiungchelys was partially hollow.
- Redescription of the anatomy of the skull of Allaeochelys libyca is published by Rollot, Evers & Joyce (2024).
- Description of an isolated cranium of Axestemys infernalis, representing the first trionychid skull material from the Maastrichtian Lance Formation (Wyoming, United States), and a study on the phylogenetic affinities of A. infernalis is published by Ponstein et al. (2024).
- Girard et al. (2024) describe new fossil material of Hutchemys rememdium from the Sentinel Butte and Bullion Creek formations of the Fort Union Group (North Dakota, United States), including the first known skull material of a member of the genus Hutchemys.
- Redescription of the holotype and a study on the affinities of Nichollsemys baieri is published by Menon et al. (2024).
- The first fossil marine turtle found with gastroliths preserved in its body cavity (a protostegid possibly belonging to the species Protosphargis veronensis) is described from the Turonian strata of Scaglia Rossa (Italy) by Serafini et al. (2024).
- Bona et al. (2024) describe dermochelyid fossils from the Leticia Formation (Tierra del Fuego, Argentina), representing the first Eocene record of marine reptiles from the southern Atlantic coast of South America, and interpret this finding as indicating that Eocene dermochelyids, like extant leatherback sea turtle, were able to live in waters with a wide temperature gradient.
- Zvonok et al. (2024) describe dermochelyid cranial and postcranial fossil material with affinities to the genera Cosmochelys and Egyptemys from the Bartonian of the Shorym Formation (Mangyshlak Peninsula, Kazakhstan), representing the first cranial remains of dermochelyids described from northern Eurasia and providing more information on the skull morphology of early dermochelyids by Zvonok et al. (2024).
- Ascarrunz & Joyce (2024) describe a plastron fragment of a turtle with affinities with "ptychogasterid" geoemydids from the Eocene Messel Formation (Germany), distinct from other turtle species described from this formation.
- Evers & Al Iawati (2024) describe the anatomy of the skull of Stylemys nebrascensis, and interpret this species as a possible stem-representative of the gopher tortoise lineage.
- Torres et al. (2024) interpret tortoise fossil material from the Late Pleistocene strata in Ecuador as belonging to the sister taxon of the Galápagos tortoises, and interpret the studied fossils as indicating that the ancestors of the Galápagos tortoises evolved large body size before reaching the Galápagos Islands from the South American continent.
- A study on the evolutionary history of turtles from insular Southeast Asia is published by Claude et al. (2024), who confirm that Duboisemys isoclina was an endemic extinct taxon.

== Archosauriformes ==
=== Other archosauriforms ===
| Name | Novelty | Status | Authors | Age | Type locality | Country | Notes | Images |
|---|---|---|---|---|---|---|---|---|
| Marcianosuchus | Gen. et sp. nov | | Sues, Spiekman & Schoch | Middle Triassic (Anisian) | Röt Formation | Germany | A non-archosaurian archosauriform. The type species is M. angustifrons. | |

==== Archosauriform research ====
- Sharma et al. (2024) describe new proterosuchid material from the Lower Triassic (Induan) Panchet Formation (India), consider fossil material of "Teratosaurus" bengalensis to likely belong to a proterosuchid, and find no evidence for the presence of more than one archosauromorph taxon in the upper Panchet Formation.
- A study on jaw mechanics of Proterochampsa nodosa de Simão-Oliveira et al. (2024), who report that Proterochampsa was able to perform bite forces comparable to those of alligators, but also that its jaws were more susceptible to bending than jaws of alligators, as well as more prone to accumulate stresses resulting from muscle contraction than both alligators and false gharials.
- LePore & McLain (2024) identify a specimen of Machaeroprosopus mccauleyi from the Chinle Formation with a sacrum including a sacralized first caudal vertebra, expanding known sacral count variation in phytosaurs.
- The smallest phytosaur femora reported to date are described from the lower Chinle Formation at Petrified Forest National Park (Arizona, United States) by Goldsmith et al. (2024), who interpret one of the studied femora as belonging to a post-hatching individual that may have died within the first year of its life, with slower growth rate than inferred for larger phytosaur specimens, and interpret their findings as suggesting that phytosaurs might have had size-dependent growth through ontogeny, with faster growth rates at later ontogenetic stages.
- Sander & Wellnitz (2024) describe a phytosaur osteoderm from the Upper Triassic strata in the Bonenburg clay pit (Contorta Beds of the Exter Formation; North Rhine-Westphalia, Germany) representing the youngest well-dated phytosaur fossil reported to date, and indicating that phytosaurs survived into the late middle Rhaetian, at most two million years before the end of the Triassic.

== Other reptiles ==
| Name | Novelty | Status | Authors | Age | Type locality | Country | Notes | Images |
|---|---|---|---|---|---|---|---|---|
| Alamitosphenos | Gen. et sp. nov | Valid | Agnolín et al. | Late Cretaceous (Maastrichtian) | Los Alamitos Formation | Argentina | A sphenodontid rhynchocephalian. The type species is A. mineri. Announced in 2023; the final article version was published in 2024. | |
| Cornualbus | Gen. et sp. nov | Valid | Silva-Neves et al. | Late Triassic (Carnian) | Santa Maria Supersequence | Brazil | A member of the family Procolophonidae belonging to the subfamily Leptopleuroninae. The type species is C. primus. | |
| Idiosaura | Gen. et sp. nov | | Kligman, Sues & Melstrom | Late Triassic (Carnian) | Vinita Formation | United States (Virginia) | A small-bodied reptile of uncertain affinities. The type species is I. virginiensis. | |
| Indosauriscus | Gen. et sp. nov | Valid | Reisz, Chatterjee & Modesto | Late Permian | Kundarum Formation | India | A member of the family Captorhinidae belonging to the subfamily Moradisaurinae. The type species is I. kuttyi. | |
| Klastomycter | Gen. et sp. nov | Valid | Reisz, Rowe & Bevitt | Permian (Sakmarian) | | United States (Oklahoma) | A member of the family Acleistorhinidae. The type species is K. conodentatus. | |
| Microzemiotes | Gen. et sp. nov | Valid | Burch et al. | Late Triassic (Norian) | Chinle Formation | United States (Arizona) | A diapsid reptile of uncertain affinities. The type species is M. sonselaensis. | |
| Notosphenos | Gen. et sp. nov | | Agnolín et al. | Late Cretaceous (Maastrichtian) | Chorrillo Formation | Argentina | A sphenodontid rhynchocephalian. The type species is N. finisterre. | |
| Palacrodon parkeri | Sp. nov | | Jenkins et al. | Late Triassic | Chinle Formation | United States (Arizona) | | |
| Parvosaurus | Gen. et sp. nov | | Freisem et al. | Late Triassic (Norian) | Arnstadt Formation | Germany | A rhynchocephalian. The type species is P. harudensis. | |
| Sumidadectes | Gen. et comb. nov | Valid | Jung & Sues | Permian (Kungurian) | Clear Fork Group & Hennessey Formation | United States (Oklahoma) | A member of the family Captorhinidae belonging to the subfamily Moradisaurinae. The type species is "Captorhinikos" chozaensis Olson (1954). | |
| Threordatoth | Gen. et sp. nov | Valid | Meade et al. | Late Triassic (Carnian–Norian) | Cromhall Quarry | United Kingdom | A leptopleuronine procolophonid. The type species is T. chasmatos. | |
| Unguinychus | Gen. et sp. nov | | Pugh et al. | Late Triassic (Norian) | Garita Creek Formation | United States (New Mexico) | A member of Drepanosauromorpha. The type species is U. onyx. | |

=== Other reptile research ===
- Redescription and a study on the affinities of Brouffia orientalis is published by Klembara et al. (2024).
- A study on the microanatomy and replacement of teeth in mesosaurs is published by Carlisbino et al. (2024).
- Fossil material of the largest mesosaur specimens reported to date is described from the Permian Mangrullo Formation (Uruguay) by Piñeiro, Núñez Demarco & Laurin (2024).
- A study on the bone microstructure of Mesosaurus tenuidens, providing evidence of distinct life history trajectories in specimens collected from different outcrops, is published by Carlisbino et al. (2024).
- Redescription and a study on the phylogenetic affinities of Bolosaurus major is published by Jenkins et al. (2024).
- New information on the skull anatomy of Soturnia caliodon and its intraspecific variation, based on the study of the skull of an immature individual, is presented by Dalle Laste et al. (2024).
- New information on the anatomy of the skull of Emeroleter levis is presented by Bazzana-Adams, MacDougall & Fröbisch (2024), who also study the phylogenetic relationships of nycteroleterids.
- A study on the chronological sequence of late Permian localities in Eastern Europe preserving pareiasaur osteoderms is published by Golubev, Naumcheva & Boyarinova (2024).
- Redescription of the anatomy of the skull and a study on the affinities of Nanoparia luckhoffi is published by Van den Brandt et al. (2024).
- Mooney et al. (2024) describe a skeleton of Captorhinus aguti from the Richards Spur locality (Oklahoma, United States), preserved with integumentary structures interpreted as remnants of the epidermis, and showing surface morphologies of the skin consistent with variation in most extant and extinct reptiles.
- Buffa et al. (2024) propose a new reconstruction of the skull and mandible of Avicranium renestoi and study the affinities of weigeltisaurids and drepanosauromorphs, recovering the former group as stem-saurian diapsids and the latter group as the sister taxon of trilophosaurids within Archosauromorpha.
- Beccari et al. (2024) describe a juvenile specimen of Pleurosaurus cf. P. ginsburgi from the Tithonian Mörnsheim Formation (Germany), representing the first unambiguous post-hatchling juvenile of Pleurosaurus reported to date, and note its similarities with Acrosaurus which might be indicative of synonymy of the two genera.
- A study on the bone histology of Priosphenodon avelasi, interpreted as indicative of alternation between periods of slow and fast growth, is published by Cavasin, Cerda & Apesteguía (2024).
- A study on the affinities of Cryptovaranoides microlanius is published by Whiteside, Chambi-Trowell & Benton (2024), who reaffirm their original conclusion that the studied reptile is a squamate with possible anguimorph affinities.
- A study on the bone histology and microanatomy of Eusaurosphargis dalassoi is published by Klein & Scheyer (2024).
- Review of the fossil record, phylogenetic relationships and likely ecology of thalattosaurs is published by Bastiaans (2024).
- Taxonomic revision of the genus Xinpusaurus is published by Maisch (2024), who considers X. suni and X. kohi to be valid species belonging to this genus, interprets X. bamaolinensis as a junior synonym of X. suni, and transfers X. xingyiensis to the genus Concavispina.
- Redescription of Pachystropheus rhaeticus is published by Quinn et al. (2024), who identify this reptile as a member of Thalattosauria.
- Redescription of the skeletal anatomy of Dinocephalosaurus orientalis is published by Spiekman et al. (2024), who interpret D. orientalis as adapted to more open waters than Tanystropheus hydroides, and consider the similarities between Dinocephalosaurus and Tanystropheus to be largely convergent.
- Redescription of Trachelosaurus fischeri, interpreted as the first unambiguous Dinocephalosaurus-like archosauromorph found outside the Guanling Formation, is published by Spiekman et al. (2024), who consider the family Trachelosauridae to be the senior synonym of the family Dinocephalosauridae, and name a new clade of non-crocopodan archosauromorphs Tanysauria.
- Rytel et al. (2024) study the internal anatomy of the cervical vertebrae of tanysaurians, and report evidence of adaptations to neck elongation that were unparalleled in other known animals.
- A study on the shape variation in the cervical vertebrae of tanystropheids and related archosauromorphs, providing evidence of existence of modularity patterns in the necks of early archosauromorphs and evidence indicating that elongated necks of tanystropheids and archosaurs evolved in different ways, is published by Rytel et al. (2024).
- A study on the bone histology of Ozimek volans, providing evidence of similarity of the histology of its long bones to those of small bats, is published by Konietzko-Meier et al. (2024).
- Marsh, Sidor & Armour Smith (2024) report the discovery of an assemblage of remains of trilophosaurids (including Trilophosaurus phasmalophos), malerisaurine azendohsaurids and indeterminate allokotosaurians from the lowermost Revueltian strata from the Sonsela Member of the Chinle Formation (Arizona, United States), and interpret this finding as indicative of coexistence of trilophosaurids and malerisaurines in the southwestern United States for approximately 10 million years during the Carnian and Norian.
- A study on the biogeography of allokotosaurians is published by Roig, Miño-Boilini & Ezcurra (2024), who identity the area of India and Tanzania as the ancestral area of Allokotosauria in general and azendohsaurids in particular, and identify eastern North America as the ancestral area of trilophosaurids.
- Redescription and a study on the affinities of Malerisaurus robinsonae is published by Sengupta, Ezcurra & Bandyopadhyay (2024).
- Redescription of the anatomy of the skull of Mesosuchus browni is published by Foster et al. (2024), who report evidence of the presence of a pneumatized maxilla and likely a well-developed vomeronasal system.
- Battista et al. (2024) describe the first hyperodapedontine rhynchosaur material from the Carnian Santacruzodon Assemblage Zone (Brazil), filling a gap within the South American rhynchosaur distribution and providing evidence of faunal similarities with other regions of Gondwana (i.e. Madagascar).
- Schiefelbein et al. (2024) describe a new specimen of "Hyperodapedon" sanjuanensis from the Upper Triassic Candelária Sequence of the Santa Maria Supersequence (Brazil), preserving delicate scleral ossicles and providing information on the visual adaptations of hyperodapedontine rhynchosaurs.
- De-Oliveira et al. (2024) describe new postcranial material of Teyujagua paradoxa from the Lower Triassic Sanga do Cabral Formation (Brazil), providing evidence of a morphology intermediate between early archosauromorphs and proterosuchids.
- Rossi et al. (2024) report that purported soft tissues of the holotype of Tridentinosaurus antiquus are actually manufactured pigment, indicating that the body outline is a forgery and the only real parts of the specimen are the hindlimbs and osteoderms, and consider the validity of the taxon to be doubtful.

== Reptiles in general ==
- A study on the development of the tympanic membrane in extant reptiles and on the presence of osteological correlates of the tympanic membrane in the fossil record of reptiles is published by Bronzati et al. (2024), who interpret their findings as indicative of a single origin of the tympanic ear and tympanic hearing at the origin of the crown group of reptiles, as well as of independent appearance of the tympanic ear and tympanic hearing in mammals, Parareptilia and the crown group of reptiles.
- Cawthorne, Whiteside & Benton (2024) describe Late Triassic reptile fossils from the Emborough, Batscombe and Highcroft quarries (Somerset, United Kingdom), including fossil material of a new crocodylomorph taxon similar to Saltoposuchus and other loricatan fossils, an ilium of Pachystropheus rhaeticus (interpreted by the authors as a thalattosaur rather than a choristodere) and fossils of a possible procolophonid, Kuehneosaurus latus, rhynchocephalians, a possible lepidosauromorph similar to Cryptovaranoides microlanius and trilophosaurids.
- Laboury et al. (2024) compare the evolution of morphology and body size of ichthyopterygians and eosauropterygians from the Middle Triassic to the Early Jurassic, finding evidence of diversification into three clades with clearly distinct skull and teeth morphologies in the latter group but not in the former one, and finding no evidence for an abrupt macroevolutionary bottleneck of the studied groups near the Triassic-Jurassic boundary.
- Reolid et al. (2024) review the evolution of marine reptiles during the Jurassic, focusing on the impact of the Toarcian Oceanic Anoxic Event, and report evidence of diversification of thalattosuchian crocodylomorphs and stenopterygid ichthyosaurs in the early Toarcian, as well evidence of extinctions of other group that survived the Toarcian Oceanic Anoxic Event later during the Toarcian.
- Zverkov et al. (2024) revise the fossil record of marine reptiles from the Callovian of European Russia, providing evidence of the presence of a relict rhomaleosaurid as well as ichthyosaurs and thalattosuchians distinct from Western European ones in the early Callovian, and evidence of exchange of marine reptile faunas between Western and Eastern European seas in the middle to late Callovian.
- Foffa, Young & Brusatte (2024) study the morphological and functional variation of lower jaws of marine reptiles from the Oxford Clay and Kimmeridge Clay formations, providing evidence of convergence of members of distantly related groups to similar feeding strategies, and likely evidence of niche partitioning among coexisting reptiles.
- A study on the orbit and eye size in fossil archosauromorphs is published by Lautenschlager et al. (2024), who find that the largest eyes relative to the skull length were mostly present in small taxa, that herbivorous species had on average both larger orbits and larger skulls than carnivores, that eyes which were large in absolute terms appeared predominantly in large-sized dinosaurs irrespective of their diet, and that different activity patterns cannot be determined on the basis of orbit size alone.
- A study on the evolution of locomotion in archosauromorph reptiles is published by Shipley et al. (2024), who interpret their findings as indicative of greater range in limb form and locomotor modes of dinosaurs compared to other archosauromorph groups, and argue that the ability to adopt a wider variety of limb forms and modes might have given dinosaurs a competitive advantage over pseudosuchians.
- A study on bite marks on bones of Hyperodapedon huxleyi from the Upper Triassic Lower Maleri Formation (India) is published by Chakraborty, Mukherjee & Ray (2024), who interpret the studied bite marks as likely produced by phytosaurs and dinosauriforms.
- Doering et al. (2024) describe new fossil material of archosauromorph reptiles from the Niemeyer complex (Santa Maria Supersequence, Brazil), including the first records of a rhynchosaur (Teyumbaita sulcognathus), a saurischian dinosaur and a probable silesaurid from this locality, and interpret the rhynchosaur remains as indicating that the site dates close to the Carnian-Norian boundary.
- LeBlanc et al. (2024) report that extant Komodo dragons maintain cutting edges of their teeth through iron-enriched coatings on their tooth serrations and tips, argue that iron sequestration is probably widespread in reptile enamels, but also find no evidence of iron coatings along theropod dinosaur tooth serrations, report that tyrannosaurid theropods had specialized, wavy enamel along their tooth serrations that likely supported the cutting edges of the teeth, and interpret these findings as either indicative of different feeding strategies of tyrannosaurids and Komodo dragons, or indicating that only large theropods had tooth enamel that was thick enough to significantly influence the mechanical wear of the tooth serrations.
- New fossil material of reptiles, including two turtle, seven lizard and eight snake taxa, is described from the Miocene and Pliocene localities in Greece by Georgalis et al. (2024).
