= Regnana Formation =

Geologic formation in Campania

- Stratigraphic range: Early Permian, Kungurian
- Type: Geological formation
- Unit of: Athesian Volcanic Complex
- Sub-units: San Pellegrino Member; Stramaiolo’ (Redebus) locality
- Underlies: Ora Formation

Lithology
- Primary: Andesite
- Other: Pyroclastic rock

Location
- Region: Pinè Valley, Italian Alps
- Country: Italy

The Regnana Formation is an Early Permian (Kungurian) geologic formation located in the Italian Alps that is part of the Athesian Volcanic Complex. Reptile and plant remains are among the fossils that have been recovered from the formation. The formation is mainly made up of andesite and pyroclastic rock.

== Paleobiota ==
Fossils reported from the Regnana Formation
Genus	Species	Location	Stratigraphic position	Material	Notes	Images
Plantae	Indeterminate	Stramaiolo' (Redebus)		Large, possibly coalified, shoot and leaf fragments	Discovered in the same fossil layer as the holotype of Tridentinosaurus	
Tridentinosaurus	T. antiquus	Stramaiolo' (Redebus)		Poorly preserved femora, tibiae, and fibulae, possible osteoderm skin impressions near the shoulder and pelvis	The body outline of the specimen is a forgery and only the scales and hindlimbs are real	

== See also ==
- Tridentinosaurus
