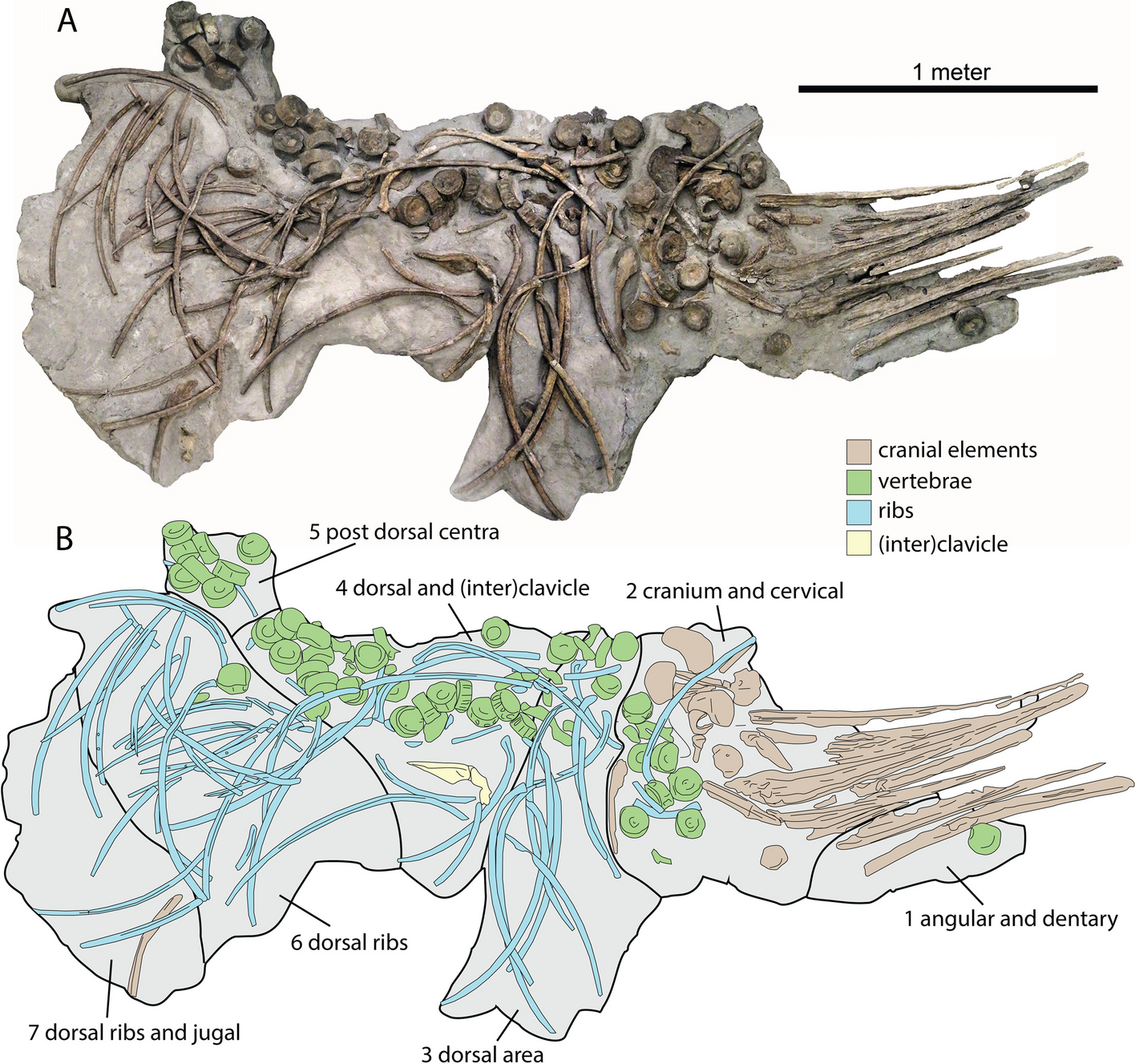
- Holotype block

Scientific classification
- Kingdom: Animalia
- Phylum: Chordata
- Class: Reptilia
- Order: †Ichthyosauria
- Node: †Ophthalmosauria
- Genus: †Argovisaurus
- Species: †A. martafernandezi

Binomial name
- †Argovisaurus martafernandezi Miedema et al., 2024

= Argovisaurus =

Argovisaurus Temporal range: Middle Jurassic (middle-late Bajocian)

Genus of ophthalmosaurian ichthyosaurs

Argovisaurus (meaning "Aargau lizard") is an extinct genus of ophthalmosaurian ichthyosaurs from the Middle Jurassic (Bajocian) Hauptrogenstein Formation of Switzerland. The genus contains a single species, A. martafernandezi, known from a partial skeleton. Argovisaurus was a large ichthyosaur compared to its relatives.

== Discovery and naming ==
The Argovisaurus holotype specimen, PIMUZ A/III 5279, was discovered and collected before 2004 by Elmar Meier in sediments of the Hauptrogenstein Formation near Auenstein in Canton of Aargau, Switzerland. The specimen consists of a largely disarticulated skeleton, including many vertebral centra and neural arches, ribs, part of both clavicles, and most of the cranium, including the braincase and jaws.

In 2024, Miedema et al. described Argovisaurus martafernandezi as a new genus and species of ophthalmosaurian ichthyosaur based on these fossil remains. The generic name, "Argovisaurus", combines "Argovia", the Latin name of Aargau, where the fossil was discovered, with the Greek "σαῦρος" ("sauros"), meaning "lizard". The specific name, "martafernandezi", honors Marta Fernández and her paleontological work on marine reptiles including ichthyosaurs.

== Description ==
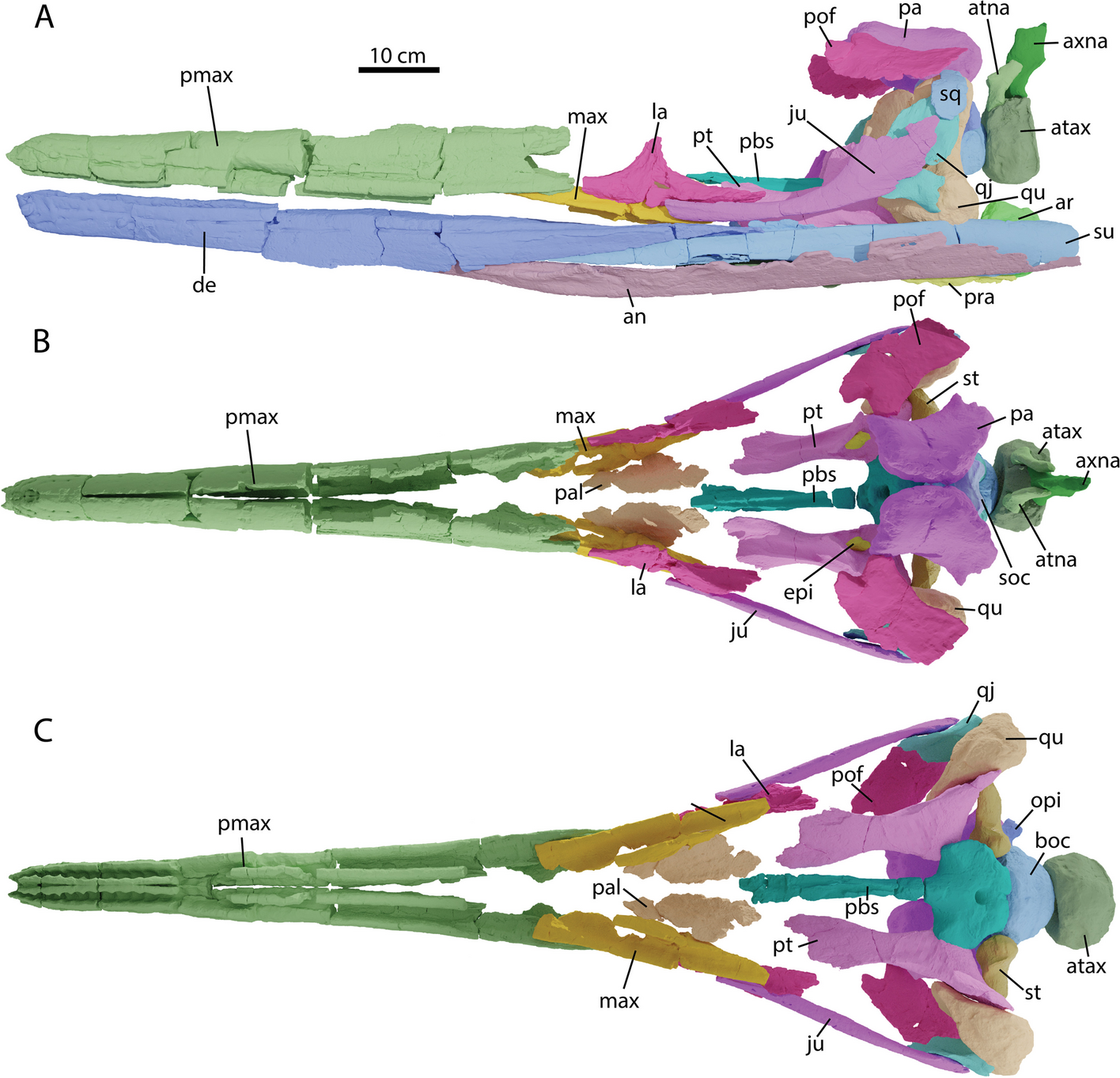
Reconstructed skull using CT scans

The holotype individual of Argovisaurus likely belonged to an animal between 4.5–6 metres (15–20 ft) long, similar in size to Mollesaurus. Within the Ophthalmosauria, few species outside of the Platypterygiinae grew this large. The mandible of the Argovisaurus is about 125 cm (49 in) long. Several of the bones of the skull and skeleton preserve abnormalities that may be attributable to traumatic injuries.

== Classification ==
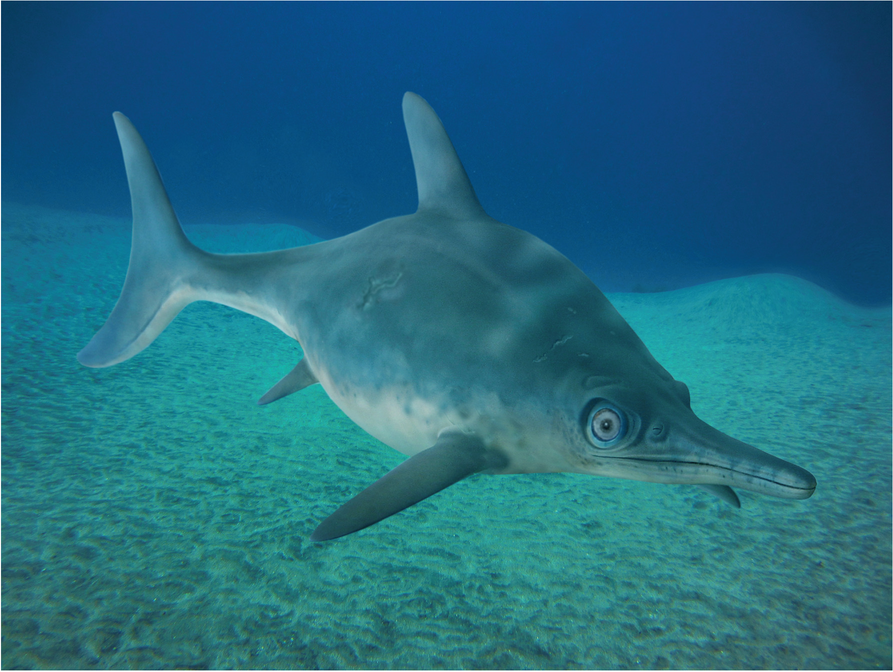
Speculative life restoration

In their phylogenetic analyses, Miedema et al. (2024) recovered Argovisaurus as an early-diverging member of the Ophthalmosauria. They began by scoring Argovisaurus in the general ichthyosaur dataset of Moon (2017), which placed it as a basal ophthalmosaur with an uncertain position. To analyze the more specific relationships, it was placed in the ophthalmosaur-focused dataset of Campos (2021). The resulting tree placed Argovisaurus in a position basal to the technical definition of the clade Ophthalmosauria, but the authors advocated that it should still be regarded as a member of this clade due to the morphological similarities. These results are displayed in the cladogram below:

- - Temnodontosaurus spp.
  - - Ichthyosaurus communis
    - - Stenopterygius quadriscissus
      - - Chacaicosaurus
        - - Argovisaurus
          - Ophthalmosauria sensu stricto
            - Mollesaurus
            - Ophthalmosaurus
            - Baptanodon
            - Gengasaurus
            - Undorosaurus gorodischensis
            - Cryopterygius
            - Thalassodraco
            - Catutosaurus
            - Acamptonectes
            - - - Janusaurus
                - Keilhauia
                - Arthropterygius spp.
              - - Platypterygiinae
