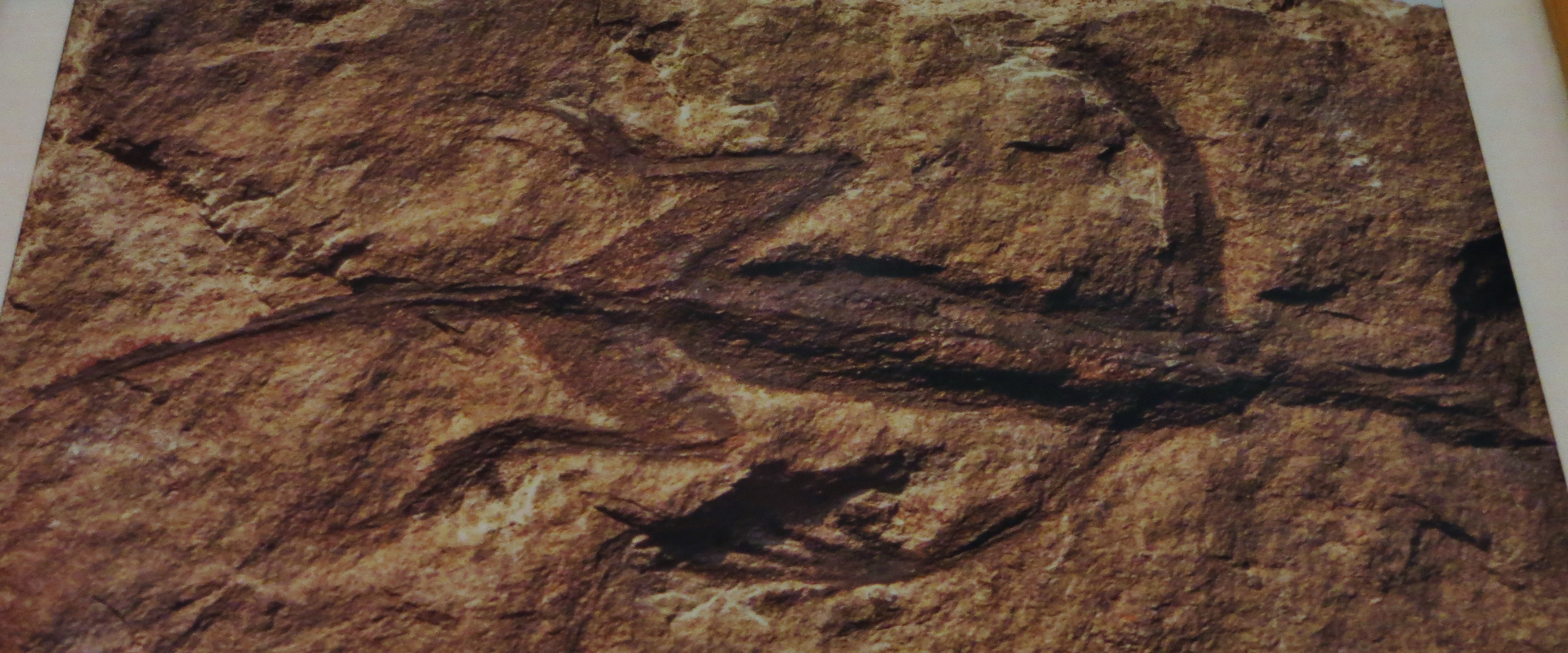
- Holotype specimen, with forged body outline

Scientific classification
- Kingdom: Animalia
- Phylum: Chordata
- Clade: Amniota
- Clade: Sauropsida
- Class: Reptilia
- Genus: †Tridentinosaurus
- Species: †T. antiquus

Binomial name
- †Tridentinosaurus antiquus Leonardi, 1959

= Tridentinosaurus =

Tridentinosaurus Temporal range: Early Permian (Cisuralian), Kungurian

Genus of controversial fossil reptiles

Tridentinosaurus (meaning "Trentino lizard") is a dubious genus of extinct fossil reptile from the early Permian Regnana Formation of the Italian Alps. The genus contains a single species, T. antiquus. Tridentinosaurus represents one of the oldest known vertebrate fossils found in Italy. The only parts of the skeleton that are preserved are the long bones of the hind limbs, and the supposed soft tissue body outline is a forgery done with paint, though some genuine scales may also be preserved. Due to the poor preservation of the limb bones, the validity of the taxon is questionable.

== History ==
The Tridentinosaurus holotype specimen, MGP-PD 26567, was discovered in 1931 in tuffaceous sandstone layers of the Regnana Formation ('Stramaiolo' (Redebus) locality) in Trentino-Alto Adige, Italy. The specimen appears to consist of a carbonized outline—missing the tip of the tail and most of the skull—of a lizard-like animal surrounding a fragmentary skeleton. Reports of the full body outline as preserved range from 23.5–26.5 centimetres (9.3–10.4 in). The specimen appears to demonstrate an elongated, slender neck and torso. The outline shows that the first through fourth toes get progressively longer, with the fifth toe being notably smaller.

Shortly after its discovery, Giambattista Dal Piaz reported on this specimen, informally giving it the name "Tridentinosaurus antiquus". In 1959, Piero Leonardi described Tridentinosaurus antiquus as a new genus and species of araeoscelidan reptile based on these remains. The generic name, "'Tridentinosaurus", combines a modified form of the Italian province "Trentino"—a reference to the location of the discovery—with the Greek "σαῦρος" ("sauros"), meaning "reptile". The specific name, "antiquus", means "ancient" in Latin.

Leonardi's taxonomic assignment of Tridentinosaurus to the Araeoscelida was later called into question, with a 1997 review of Paleozoic vertebrate fossils from the Alps considering this classification doubtful. Some later reviews instead considered it more appropriate to assign Tridentinosaurus to the Protorosauria, or, more broadly, the Diapsida.

The specimen was briefly mentioned several times in the following years, with some publications drawing comparisons between the inferred body shape of Tridentinosaurus and other new fossils. In their 2019 description of the mesenosaurine varanopid Cabarzia, Spindler, Werneburg & Schneider noted similarities between the proportions of the apparent Tridentinosaurus body shape and other taxa. For example, the slender neck is similar to the varanopid Mesenosaurus, and the limb proportions—especially the large manus—are similar to the araeoscelidan Petrolacosaurus.

=== Forgery ===
In 2024, Rossi and colleagues published the results of several detailed analyses of the holotype specimen of Tridentinosaurus. They found that the purported carbonized soft tissues seen on the specimen were forged, instead being the result of a manufactured pigment like black paint. Using ultraviolet light, 3D surface modeling, scanning electron microscopy with energy dispersive spectroscopy, micro x-ray diffraction, Raman and attenuated total reflectance Fourier transformed infrared spectroscopy, they determined that the body shape had been carved by hand, possibly in an effort to reveal additional skeletal material, and that the coloration was added later. For example, UV light revealed that the body outline fluoresced, something that fossilized organic materials do not typically do, but coatings like glues, varnishes, and some pigments do. It is unknown when the forgery was made or who was involved, but the discovery of carbonized plant fossils with a similar dark outline in a similar locality played a significant role in misleading paleontologists. Thus, previous inferences derived from observations of the body outline are unreliable, and the validity of Tridentinosaurus is questionable.

The only visible bones belong to the hindlimbs, consisting of poorly preserved femora, tibiae, and fibulae. While the body outline is not real, the researchers did observe skin impressions near the shoulder and pelvic girdles, consisting of small rhomboidal scales that may represent osteoderms. It is possible that future analyses, such as using CT scan technology, may reveal more bones.
