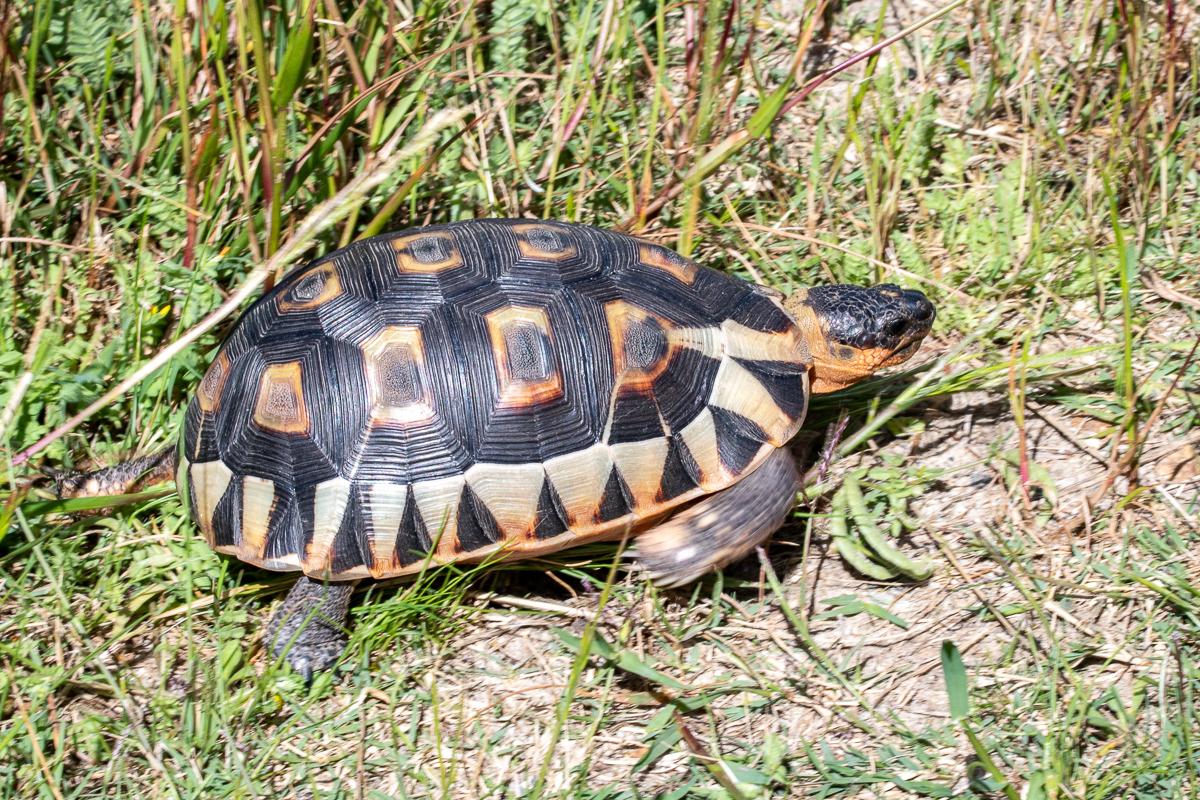
- In South Africa

Conservation status
- Least Concern (IUCN 3.1)

Scientific classification
- Kingdom: Animalia
- Phylum: Chordata
- Class: Reptilia
- Order: Testudines
- Suborder: Cryptodira
- Family: Testudinidae
- Genus: Chersina
- Species: C. angulata

Binomial name
- Chersina angulata (Schweigger, 1812)
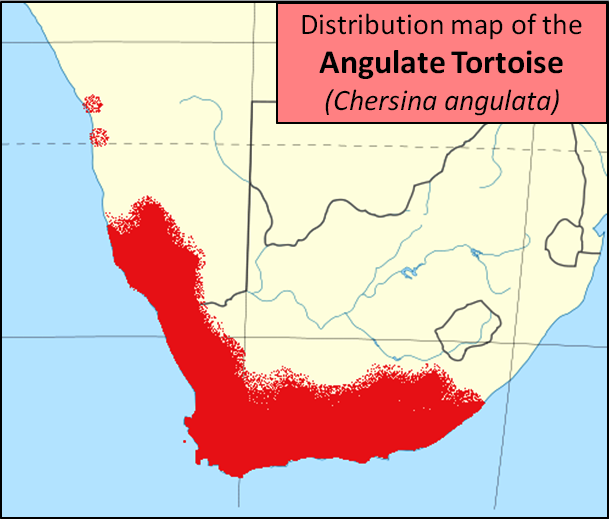

Synonyms
- List: Testudo angulata Schweigger, 1812; Testudo bellii Gray, 1828; Chersina angulata Gray, 1831; Neotestudo angulata Hewitt, 1931; Goniochersus angulatus Mertens, Müller & Rust, 1934; Chersine angulata Hewitt, 1937; Goniocherus angulatus Mertens & Wermuth, 1955

= Angulate tortoise =

Species of tortoise

The angulate tortoise (Chersina angulata) or bowsprit tortoise is a species of tortoise found in dry areas and coastal scrub vegetation in South Africa. It is the only living member of the genus Chersina.

== Etymology ==
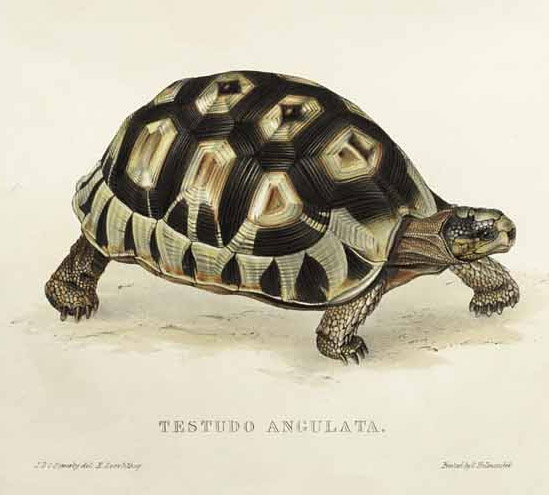
1830s illustration

Internationally it is known by the two names of "angulate" and "bowsprit" tortoise. Locally in southern Africa however, it is uniformly known as the "angulate" tortoise in English, and as the rooipens skilpad ("red-belly tortoise") in Afrikaans.

== Taxonomy ==
This species is highly distinctive and is now classified by itself, in the monotypic Chersina genus. While it differs considerably from all other tortoise species, its closest relatives, according to phylogenetic studies, are the tiny "padloper" (Homopus) tortoise species, with which it shares its southern African habitat.

== Distribution and habitat ==
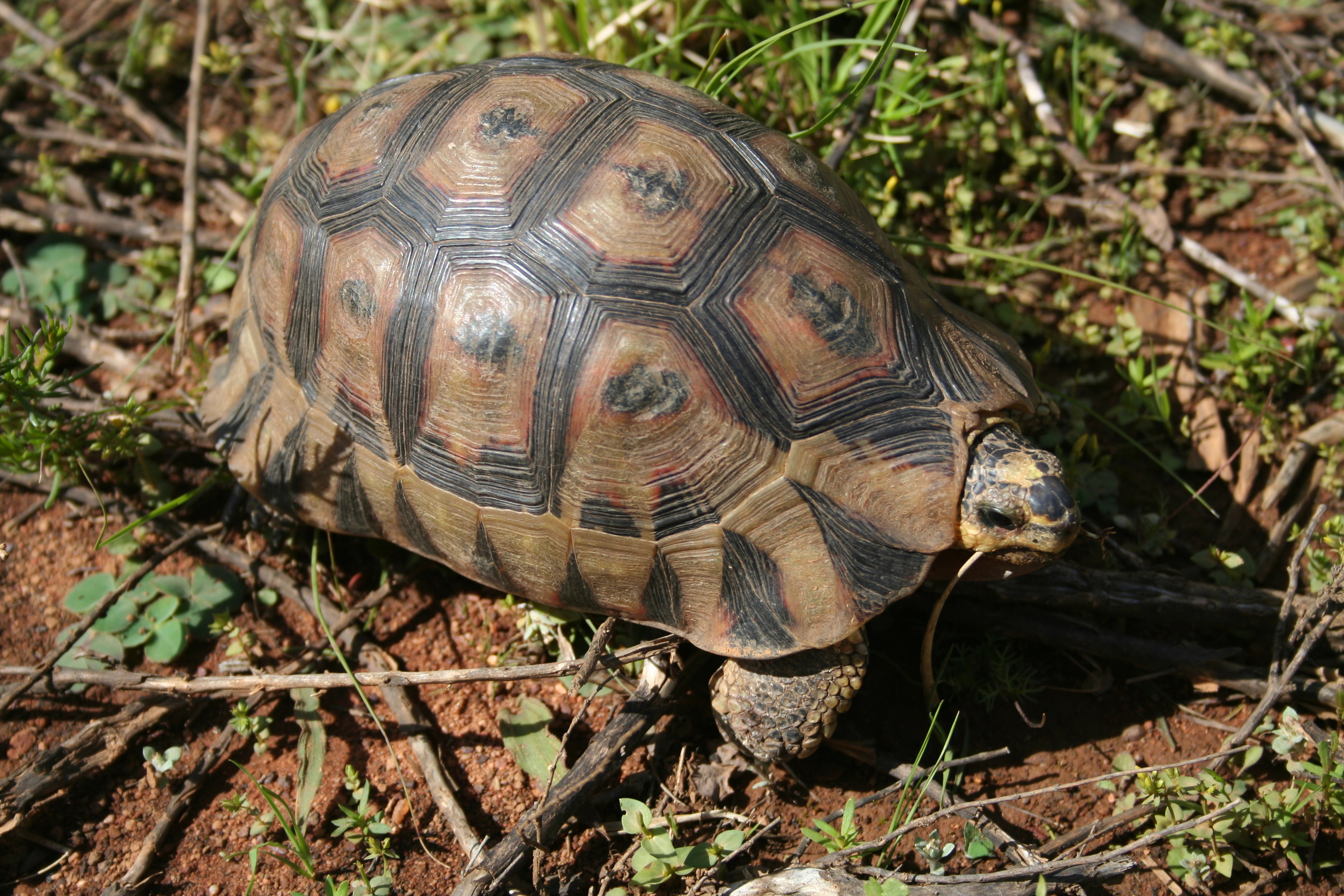
In its natural fynbos scrub habitat

Their natural habitat is the fynbos, karoo, albany thickets and coastal scrub (strandveld) vegetation of the south-western part of South Africa. This is an area of semi-arid and Mediterranean climate, with winter rainfall. Within this climatic range however, the angulate tortoise is a tough and very adaptable species.

Geographically, this natural range extends across the Cape Floristic Region, as far north as the southern part of Namibia. In addition, small colonies have been introduced by tourists to domestic gardens in Swakopmund and Walvis Bay, even further north, in central Namibia. To the east, its range extends along the Cape's southern coast as far as East London. There is also an especially dense colony on Dassen Island, off the South African coast. Throughout its range, this tortoise usually occurs in the greatest numbers near the coast. Inland it occurs at lesser densities, though smaller populations are even found in parts of the Karoo.

== Description ==
=== Identification ===
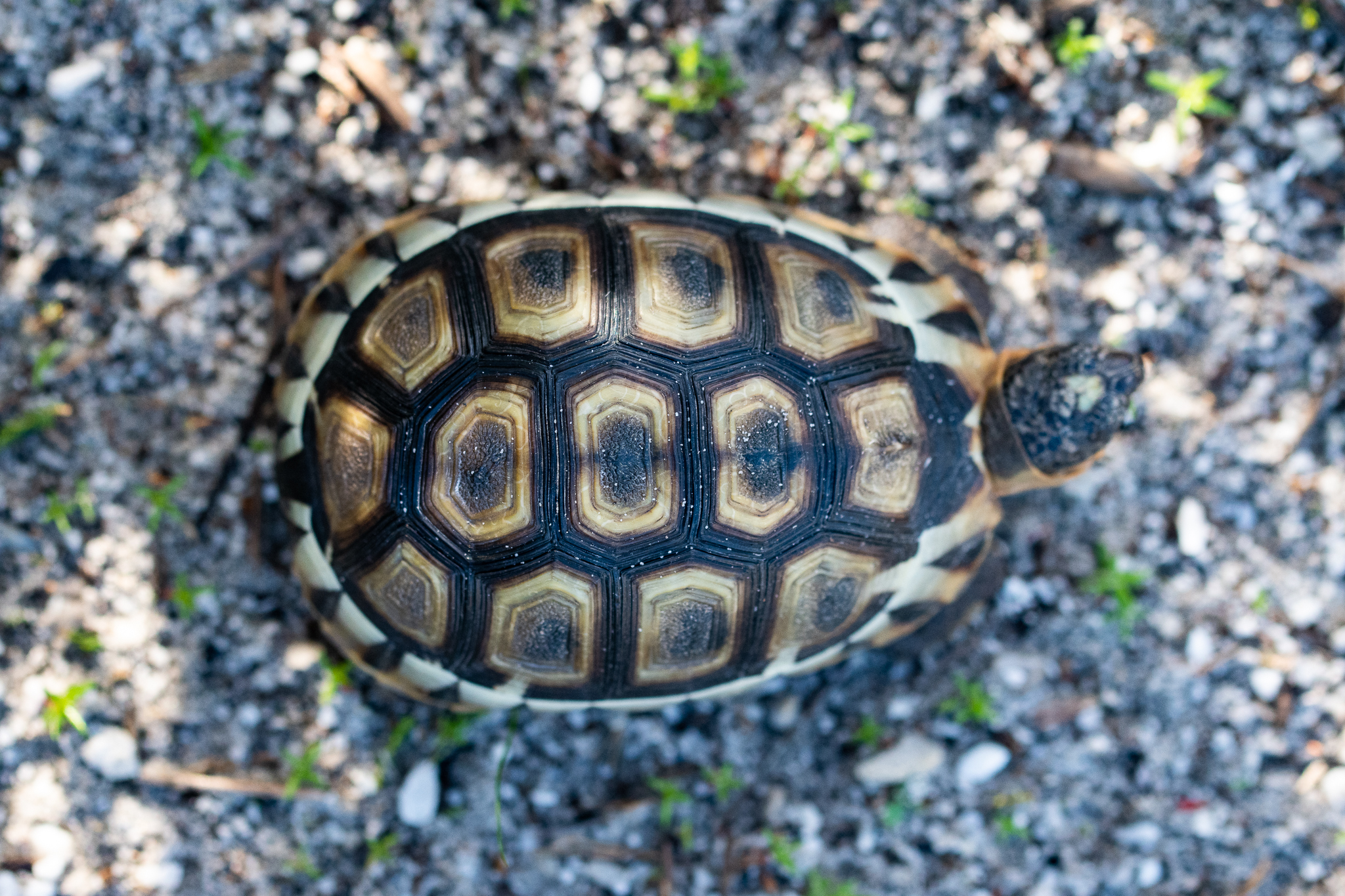
Dorsal view

A small, shy tortoise with a relatively variable shell, they can often be distinguished by their prominent "bowsprits", which are protrusions of the "gular" shields, from their plastrons under their chins. These are used by males to fight for territory or females. Uniquely, this species has only one gular shield under its chin; all other southern African tortoises have a divided/double scaled gular. Angulate specimens have five claws on their front legs and four on each back leg. They also, like most other southern African tortoises, have a nuchal scute.

=== Regional variation ===
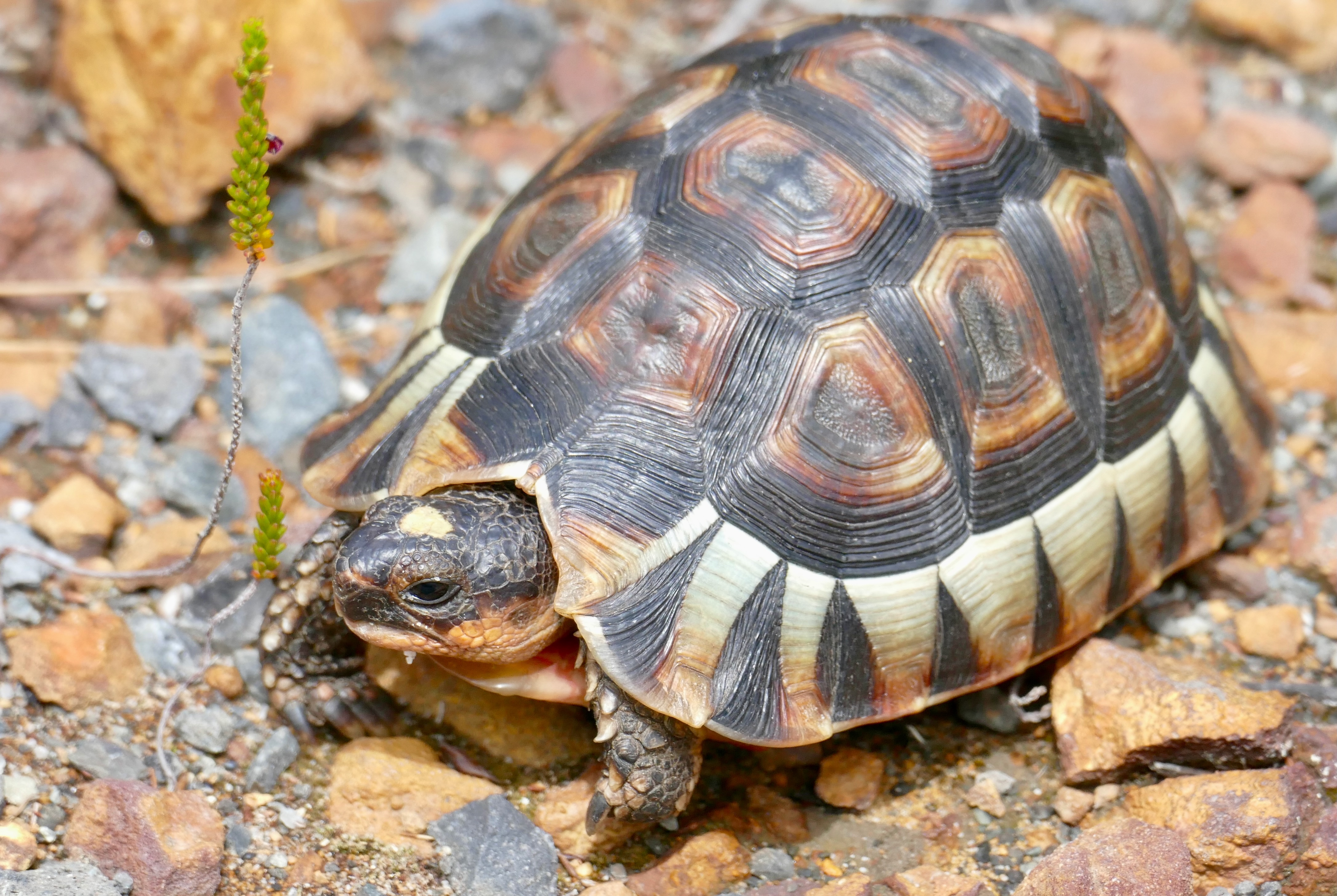
In Western Cape, South Africa

There is considerable regional variation in this species of tortoise. Angulates from the west coast of southern Africa tend to have a reddish colour, especially on the underside of their shell (from where their Afrikaans name of rooipens or "red-belly" comes). Inland specimens from the Karoo region are often darker, and some are known to be uniformly black. To the east of their range, individuals are typically smaller and have a lighter colour. Such tendencies can be diluted by admixture however, and in all populations individuals tend to assume a uniform brown colour in old age.

=== Sexual dimorphism ===
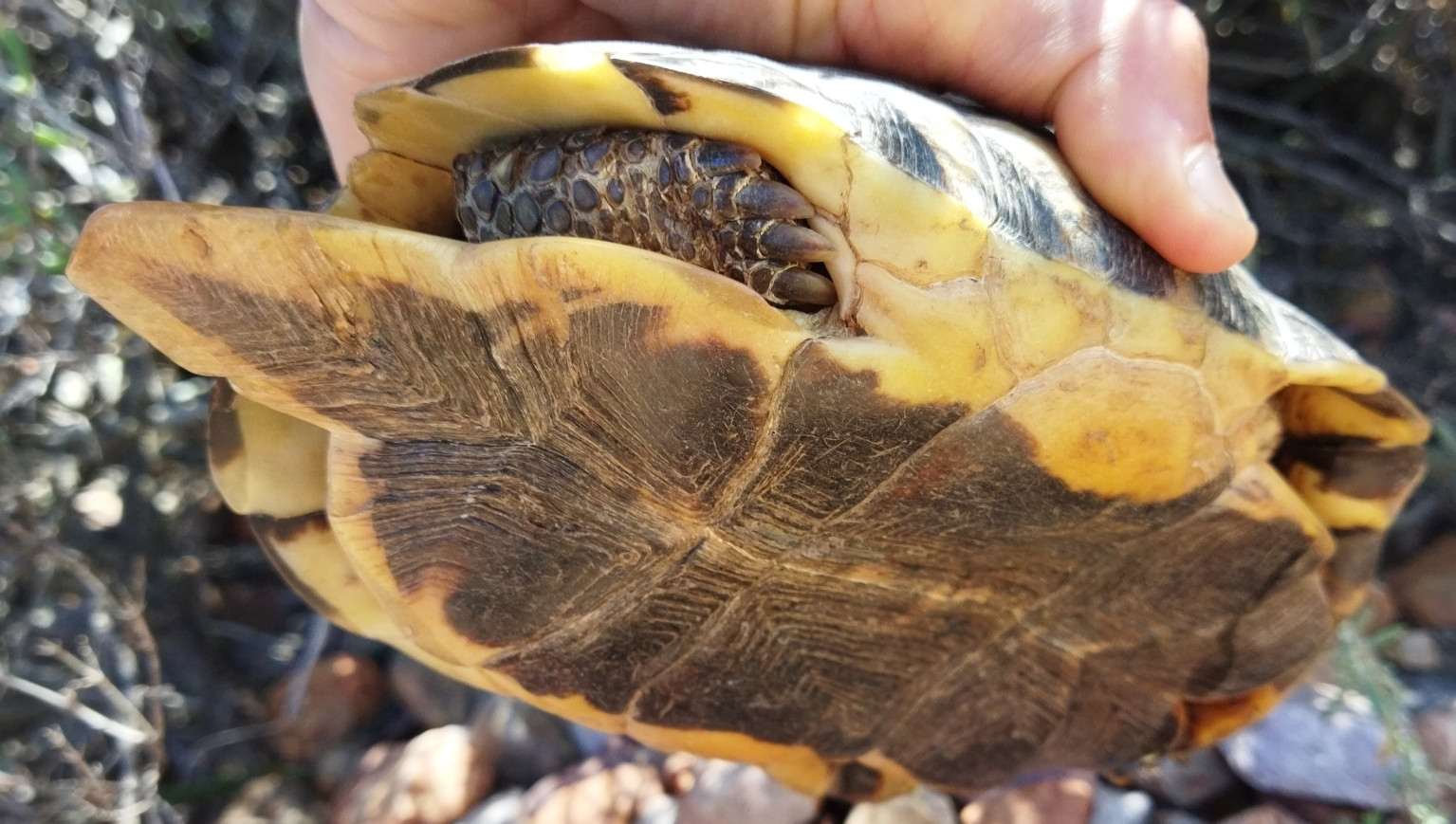
Male, showing the gular shield

This species shows considerable difference between male and female individuals. The male angulates tend to be larger, to have concave bellies, and to have a longer, thinner, "peanut" shape. They also have enlarged and extended gular scutes under their chins, which they use for sparring with each other.

The females tend to be smaller and rounder, with a flat or slightly convex belly. Males tend to have a cream-coloured mark on top of their head

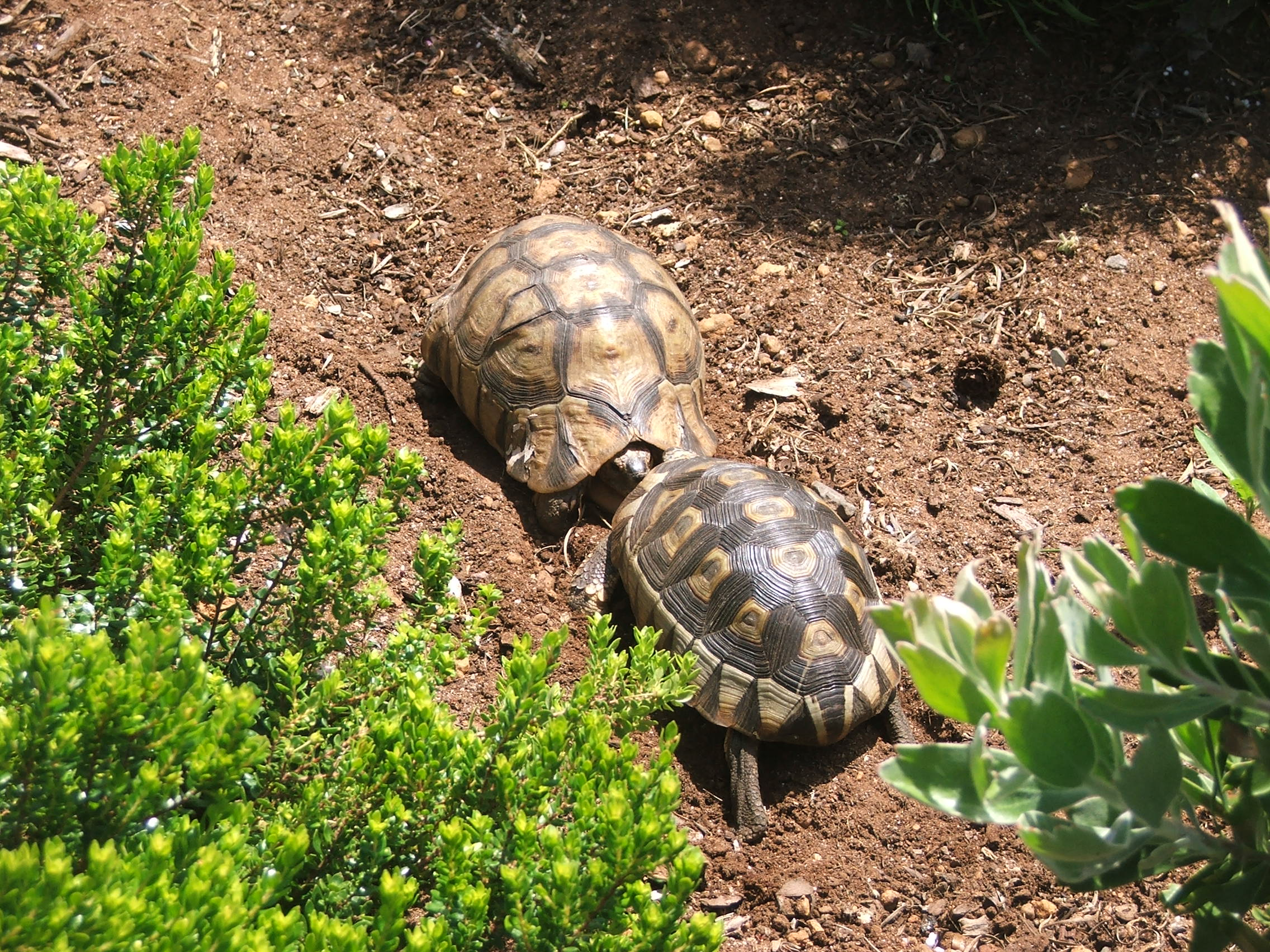
Male angulate tortoises "jousting"

== Ecology ==
Within its natural range, the natural predators of the species include mongoose, jackals, badgers, baboons and predatory birds which attack the infants. Perhaps the largest killers of this species in its natural habitat are the periodic wildfires, which can kill hundreds of thousands at a time.

=== Diet ===
Herbs and grasses are the most important foods in the diet of angulate tortoises. However, angulate tortoises are food generalists, and will consume a wide variety of angiosperms, as well as mosses, mushrooms, insects, snail shells, and animal feces. Their diet changes seasonally based on the availability of food sources.

On Dassen Island, rabbit feces can contribute nearly 30% of their diet in summer and fall. This may be a result of the low diversity of vegetation and shortage of food plants during the dry season on the island. Alongside nutrition, coprophagy is hypothesized to aid the digestion of cellulose by supplementing gut microflora. Dassen Island tortoises also eat sand, perhaps to supplement minerals or to aid in digestion.

== Conservation ==
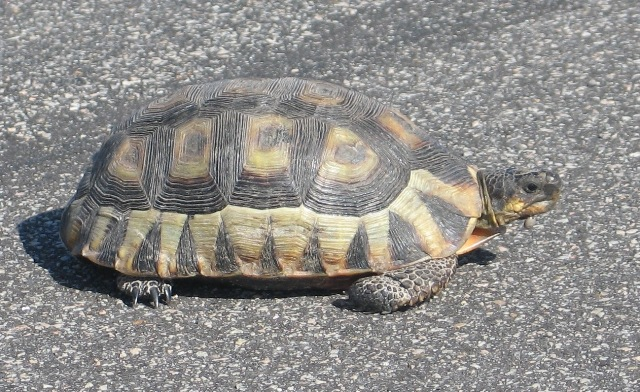
Angulates are often spotted crossing rural roads and highways. Drivers may stop and assist them in crossing, but are prohibited by law from removing them from their natural area.

Due to human activity, it is also increasingly threatened by habitat destruction from agriculture and other development, as well as illegal collecting for the pet trade and deaths from tortoises crossing busy roads. Human introduced species such as the pied crow kill thousands of infants every year, especially along the West Coast where this invasive species is rapidly spreading.

The angulate tortoise is commonly kept as a garden pet in South Africa. However the species is classified as "Protected Wild Animal" in the Nature Conservation Ordinance No. 19 (1974), and it is therefore strictly illegal to remove this animal from the wild. It may also not be transported, possessed, imported or exported without a permit.

A commonly reported problem is that, when a tortoise is spotted crossing rural roads, drivers tend to stop, pick it up and take it home - away from its habitat in the wild. This is illegal and traumatic for the tortoise. Instead drivers are encouraged to stop and, if they wish, assist it crossing the road in the direction that it was going.

Nonetheless, there is a legal and regulated pet trade in this tortoise, especially for captive-bred specimens. However it is absolutely imperative to attain a permit when buying, selling or keeping this species.

=== Illegal trade and exports ===
Like many species of tortoises, the angulate is increasingly threatened by illegal collecting for the pet trade. When transported outside of their natural range and climate, these tortoises usually die. This is partly because they are adapted to the warm, dry, Mediterranean-type climate of the Cape, but also because they require a wide range of plant foods, which they typically do not receive when they are kept as pets by inexperienced keepers.

Internationally, the species is regulated by the CITES, or Convention on the International Trade in Endangered Species of Fauna and Flora (Appendix II), as well as other legislation on their international trade.
