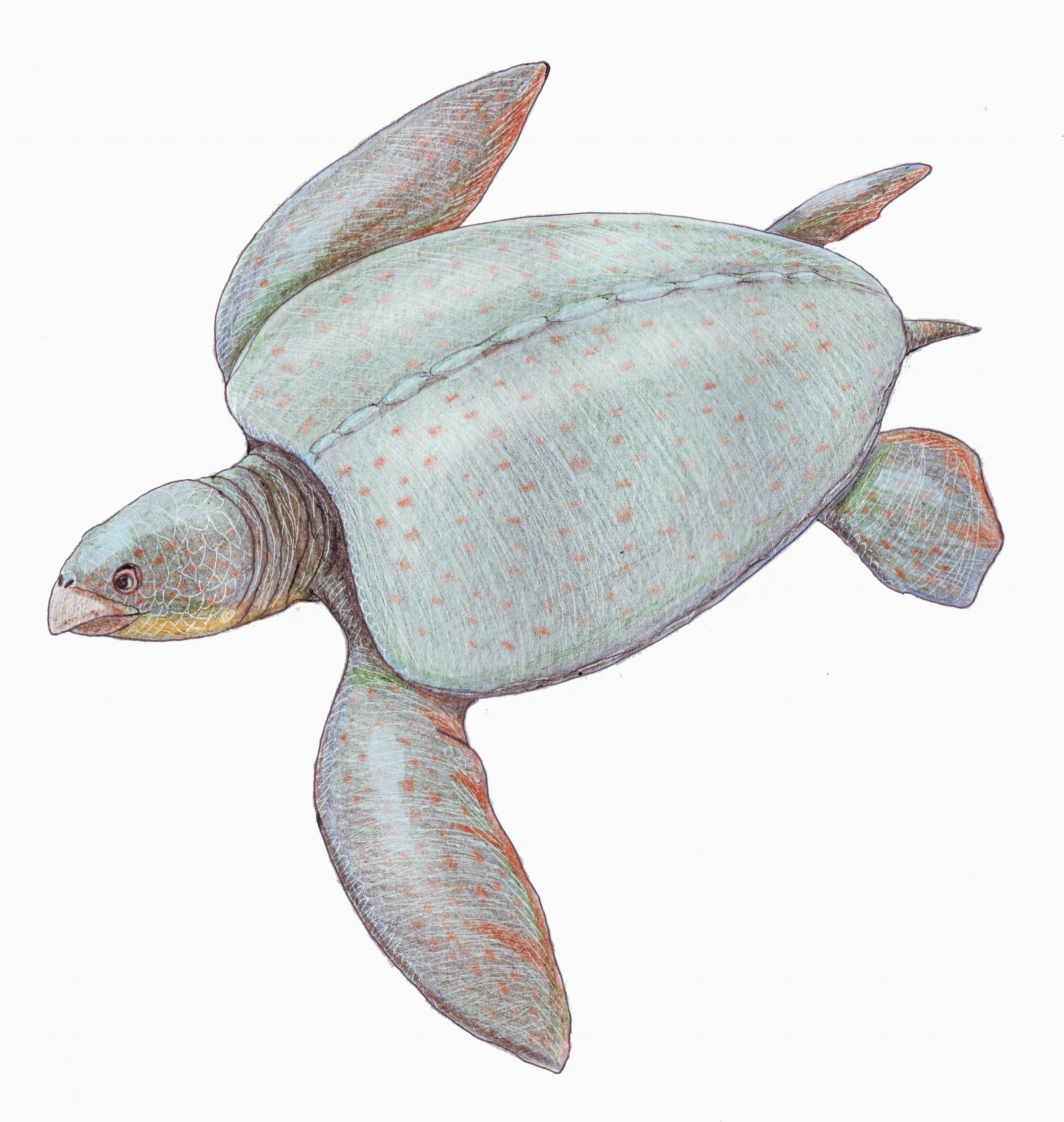

Scientific classification
- Kingdom: Animalia
- Phylum: Chordata
- Class: Reptilia
- Order: Testudines
- Suborder: Cryptodira
- Clade: Pancheloniidae
- Genus: †Protosphargis; Capellini, 1884

= Protosphargis =

Protosphargis Temporal range: Late Cretaceous

Extinct genus of turtles

Protosphargis is an extinct genus of sea turtle from the Upper Cretaceous of Italy. It was first named by Capellini in 1884.

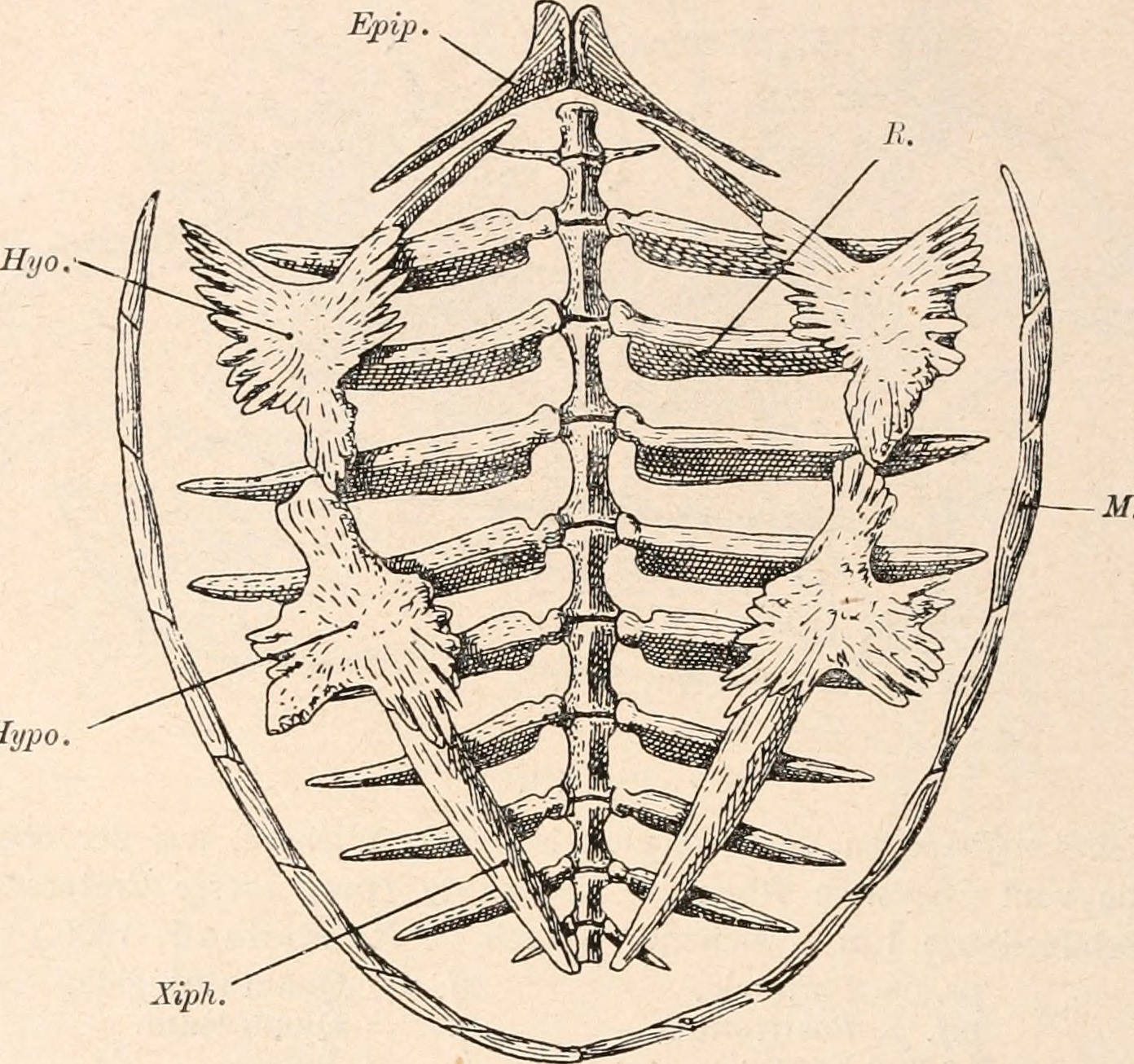
Protosphargis veronensis carapace, ventral view

== Sources ==
- Protosphargis at the Paleobiology Database
- The Journal of Geology By Thomas Chrowder Chamberlin, University of Chicago Dept. of Geology, University of Chicago Dept. of Geology and Paleontology. Page 726.
