= Chersina langebaanwegi =

Chersina langebaanwegi Temporal range: Zanclean

Scientific classification
- Kingdom: Animalia
- Phylum: Chordata
- Class: Reptilia
- Order: Testudines
- Suborder: Cryptodira
- Family: Testudinidae
- Genus: Chersina
- Species: C. langebaanwegi

Binomial name
- Chersina langebaanwegi Delfino et al., 2024

Extinct species of tortoise

Chersina langebaanwegi is an extinct species of Chersina that lived in South Africa during the Early Pliocene.
