= Lusochelys =

Lusochelys Temporal range: Middle Miocene

Scientific classification
- Domain: Eukaryota
- Kingdom: Animalia
- Phylum: Chordata
- Class: Reptilia
- Order: Testudines
- Suborder: Cryptodira
- Superfamily: Chelonioidea
- Family: Cheloniidae
- Genus: †Lusochelys; Pérez-García and Antunes, 2024
- Species: †L. emilianoi

Binomial name
- †Lusochelys emilianoi Pérez-García and Antunes, 2024

Lusochelys is an extinct genus of pancheloniid turtle from the Middle Miocene of Portugal.
