= Hauptrogenstein Formation =

Geologic formation in Germany and Switzerland

- Stratigraphic range: Middle Jurassic, Bajocian–Bathonian
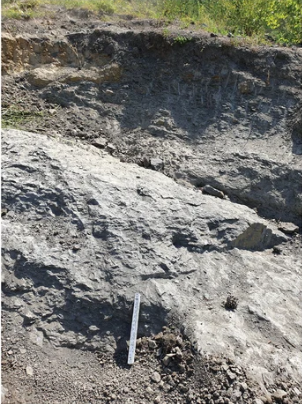
- Outcrop at Auenstein Oberegg, Switzerland
- Type: Formation
- Sub-units: Lower Acuminata beds (subfurcatum/niortense zone); Parkinsoni-Schichten (parkinsoni zone); Obere Acuminata-Schichten
- Underlies: Spatkalk
- Overlies: Wildegg Formation

Lithology
- Primary: Limestone, Wackestone

Location
- Country: Germany, Switzerland

The Hauptrogenstein Formation is a geologic formation in Germany and Switzerland. It preserves fossils that date back to the Middle Jurassic period (Bajocian-Bathonian).

== Paleofauna ==
List as per Miedema et al. (2024):

- Argovisaurus martafernandezi
- Bakevelliidae indet.
- Bivalvia indet.
- Ectocochleate cephalopods
- Gervillella
- Goniomya literata
- Homomya
- Lockeia?
- Lytoceras cf. eudesianum
- Machimosaurini indet.
- Megateuthis suevica
- Nautilida indet.
- Parkinsonia (Oraniceras) fretensis
- Pleuromya
- Praeexogyra acuminata
- Procerites sp.
- Teichichnus?
- Terebratula furcilensis
- Terebratula movelierensis
- Thalassinoides
- Trigoniidae indet.

== See also ==
- List of fossiliferous stratigraphic units in Germany
