= Palazzo Cavalli alle Porte Contarine =

Coordinates: 45°24′45″N 11°52′42″E

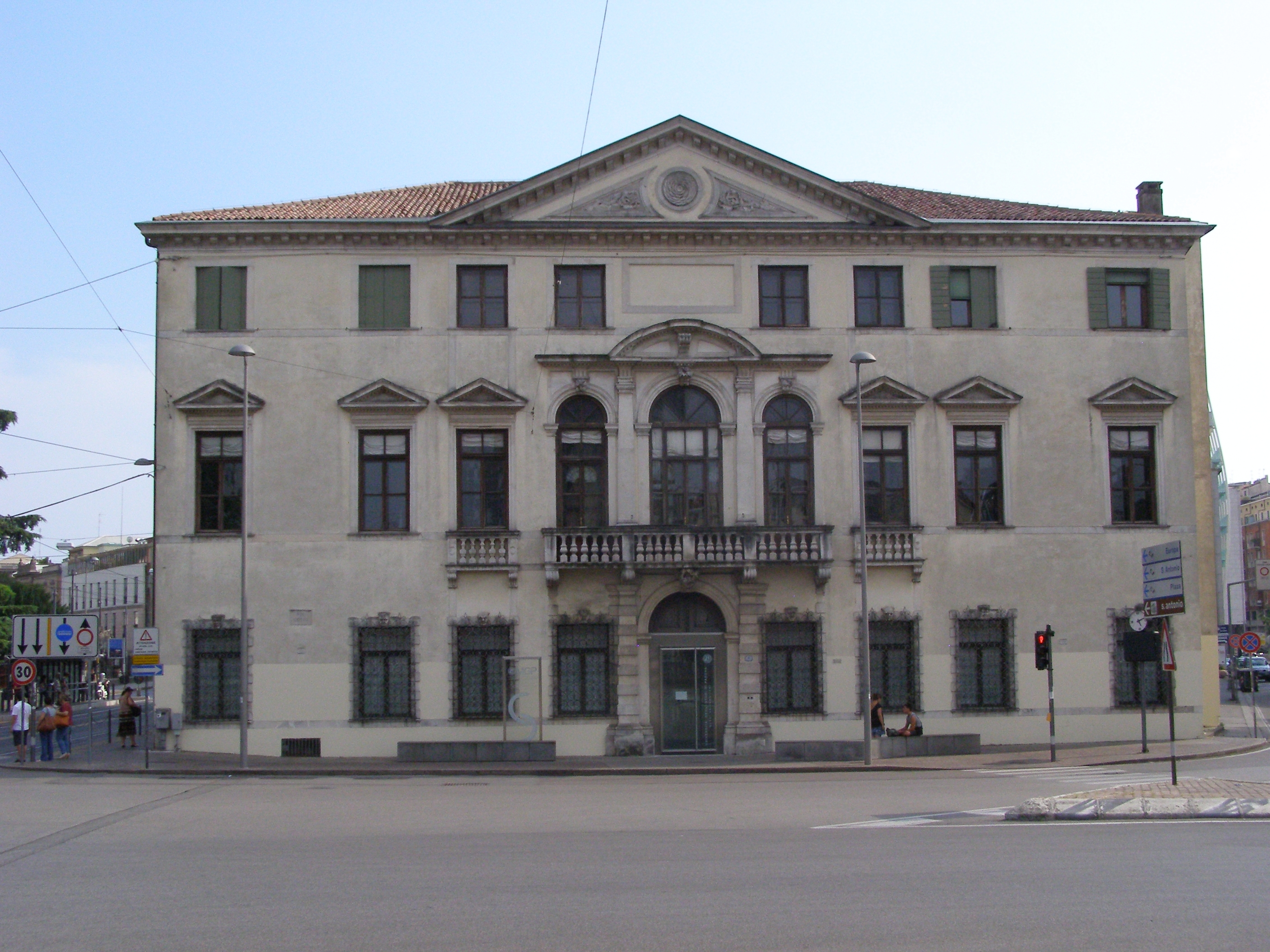
Facade of Palace Cavalli alle Porte Contarine

The Palazzo Cavalli alle Porte Contarine, also called the Palazzo Cavalli agli Eremitani is a Renaissance-style palace located at the intersection of Corso Giuseppe Garibaldi and Via Giacomo Matteotti in Padua, region of Veneto, Italy. In 2019, it is owned by the University of Padua and houses the university's collections of geology and paleontology in the Museo della Natura e dell’Uomo (Museum of nature and Humankind).

== History ==
Located away from the city center, the palace was constructed in the 1560s, commissioned by Marino Cavalli the elder, a Venetian ambassador.

Notable in the palace's history was that in 1585, it was the site of the infamous murder of Vittoria Accoramboni, the widow of the Duke of Bracciano. The intrigues in her life became the basis for the Jacobean play by John Webster titled The White Devil (1612).

The palace was extensively refurbished in at the turn of the seventeenth and eighteenth centuries on the initiative of Federico Cavalli and his wife Elisabetta Duodo. At the end of the eighteenth century the property passed to the son of the last representative of the family, Giacomo Bollani, whose heirs sold it to the state, who used it as a customs office. In 1892, it was used to house the University of Padua's Application School for Engineers and from 1932 the collections and the Institute of Geology, today the Department of Geosciences were moved here.

The interiors have elegant fresco decoration. The ground floor frescoes, depicting the mythologic, historic, and biblical episodes are attributed to Michele Primon. There are scenes of a deer hunt in the Sala della Caccia. The staircase has frescoes depicting the ascent of the arts to Apollo, painted by Antonio Felice Ferrari and Giacomo Parolini. The main salon in the piano nobile was decorated by Louis Dorigny. The original ceiling fresco was repainted in the late 19th century with a fresco depicting the Triumph of Science and Technology.
