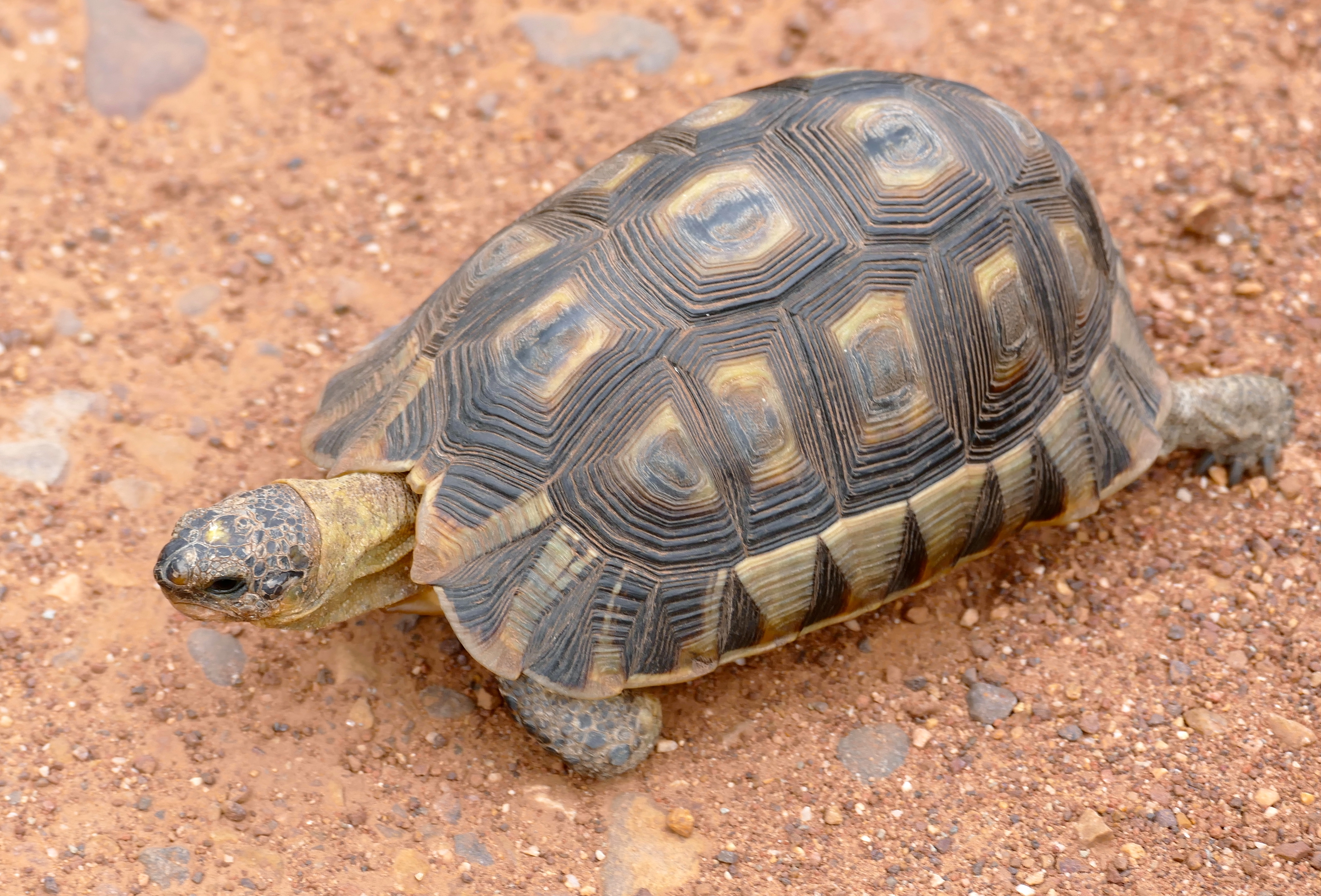
- Angulate tortoise (Chersina angulata)

Scientific classification
- Kingdom: Animalia
- Phylum: Chordata
- Class: Reptilia
- Order: Testudines
- Suborder: Cryptodira
- Family: Testudinidae
- Genus: Chersina; Gray, 1830

Species
- Chersina angulata; †Chersina langebaanwegi

= Chersina =

Chersina Temporal range: Early Pliocene - Recent, 5.1–0 Ma

Genus of tortoise

Chersina is a genus of tortoises in the family Testudinidae. It contains a single living species, the angulate tortoise. A fossil species, Chersina langebaanwegi, is known from the Early Pliocene of South Africa.
