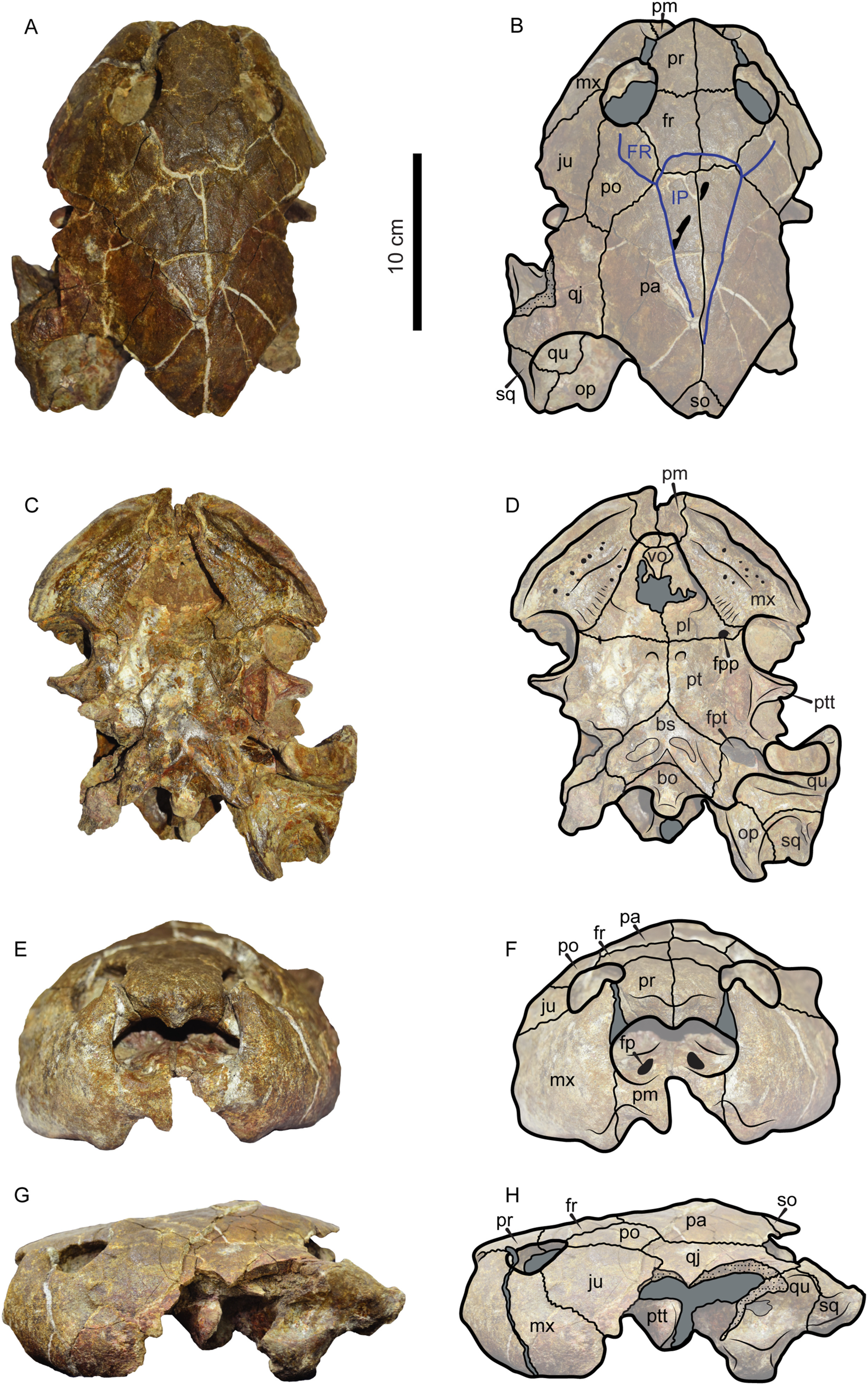
- Photographs and diagram of the skull

Scientific classification
- Kingdom: Animalia
- Phylum: Chordata
- Class: Reptilia
- Order: Testudines
- Suborder: Pleurodira
- Family: Podocnemididae
- Genus: Caninemys; Meylan et al, 2009

Type species
- †Caninemys tridentata Meylan et al, 2009

= Caninemys =

Caninemys Temporal range: Serravallian - Messinian 11.608–5.332 Ma

Extinct genus of turtles

Caninemys is an extinct genus of large freshwater side-necked turtle, belonging to the family Podocnemididae. Its fossils have been found in Brazil and Colombia, in rocks dating back from the middle to late Miocene.

== Discovery and naming ==
The type specimen of Caninemys, a well preserved skull (DNPM-MCT 1496-R), was found in 1962 in Acre State, Brazil by Llewellyn Ivor Price. Originally mentioned by Lapparent de Broin (1993) alongside several shell fragments similar to Stupendemys, it was concluded that the data was insufficient to refer the skull to the massive podocnemid, especially in the light of other similarly sized turtle remains from Miocene South America. In 2009 Meylan, Gaffney and De Almeida Campos described Caninemys on the basis of the skull alone, not including the shell fragments mentioned by de Broin due to the possibility of a chimeric combination. They do however consider it very probable that LACM 141498, a lower jaw, belongs to the same taxon. Both the holotype skull and the aforementioned lower jaw were used as a basis for the skull of the restored Stupendemys skeleton exhibited at the American Museum of Natural History. However, for the remains of the enormous Stupendemys to match the skull material of Caninemys, the later had to be scaled up to twice its original size.

In 2020 Cadena and colleagues described new specimens of Stupendemys geographica, in the process synonymizing both S. souzai and Caninemys with this genus on the basis of lower jaws found in the same area as Stupendemys fossils. Later finds of additional Caninemys material (shells and skulls) as well as new undisputed Stupendemys skull material helped re-establish Caninemys as a valid genus. The new material was discovered in the Colombian La Victoria Formation in the Tatacoa Desert.

Caninemys is named for its bulldog-like appearance, with the maxillary processes found in the taxon mirroring the placement of the canine (tooth) in mammals. The species name derives from the tridentate ("three toothed") appearance of the skull, as most easily observed when viewed from the front.

== Description ==
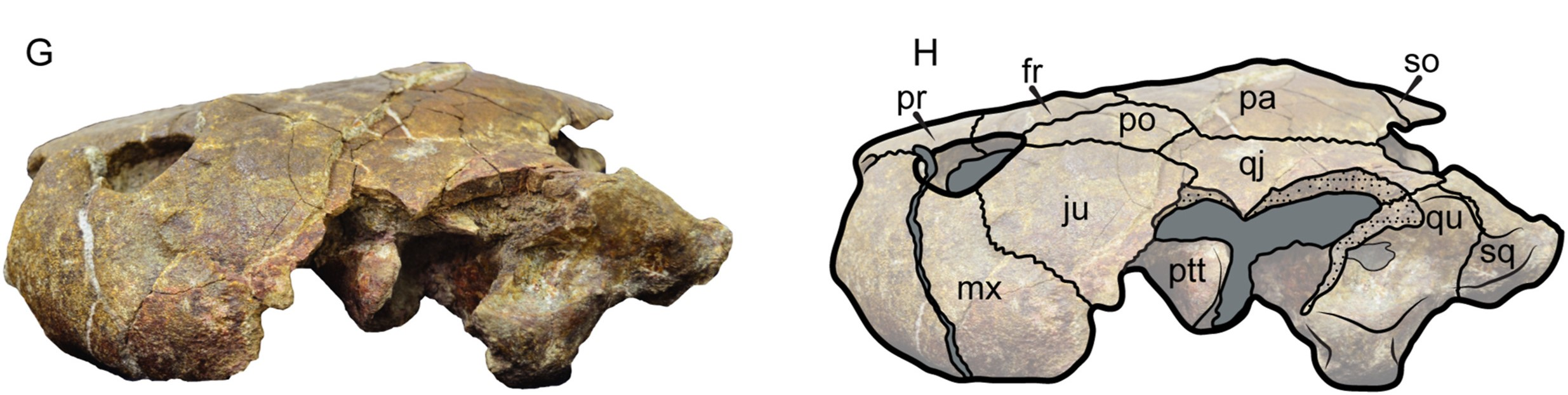
Caninemys skull

The skull of Caninemys is robust and roughly triangular in shape with thick and massive premaxilla. The eyes are dorsally oriented, facing slightly upward. No nasal bones are present as in other members of Pelomedusoides. Instead the prefrontals make up most of the anterior portion of the skull, including the area just above the nares. The prefrontals extend past the maxilla, giving it a somewhat stub-nosed appearance. The paired prefrontals, frontals and parietals all contact their respective second bone at the midline. The frontals lack the groove that is characteristic for Podocnemis. Scales are preserved on the skull roof, especially over the parietals. Based on this Caninemys had triangular interparietal scales, similar to modern Podocnemis species. The premaxilla are paired, but only make up a small portion of the jaws just below the nares. The triturating (grinding) surface of Caninemys is notably more complex than in modern podocnemidids, with a sharp labial ridge that forms a small but distinct toothlike process at the midline contact of the premaxilla. The premaxilla also form a large recess to accommodate for a hooked lower jaw, as seen in the modern Alligator Snapping Turtle. The maxilla of Caninemys are noticeably enlarged and give the animal a superficially "bulldog-like" appearance. The maxilla also stands out for the large, tooth-like processes formed by the labial ridge and flanking the premaxilla on both sides. These processes, superficially resembling the canine teeth seen in mammals, are very noticeable when the skull is viewed head-on. These two processes, alongside the premaxillary process, account for the tridentate condition that gives Caninemys tridentata its species name. Even without these processes the labial ridge is very pronounced in Caninemys, being thick and extending downward 2 centimeters into a flattened edge. The ridge curves upwards close to the maxilla, creating a u-shaped notch. However, Caninemys does not possess a secondary palate like in Bairdemys, Stereogenys and Shweboemys.

The lower jaw LACM 141498 may represent the same taxon as the Caninemys holotype. The lower jaw possesses a pronounced symphyseal hook similar to those seen in modern alligator snapping and musk turtles. Although the jaw is slightly too large to belong to the exact same specimen as the holotype, the jaws line up well. While there is no direct link between the two fossils, they match closely enough to suggest they belong to at least closely related taxa, if not the same species. This would suggest that Caninemys, besides having pronounced maxilla, also had a robust and hooked lower jaw. This combination of features leads Meylan et al. to compare Caninemys to a "pleurodiran snapping turtle".

Based on the head:shell ratio of extant podocnemidid species (including Podocnemis expansa), Caninemys was likely much smaller than Stupendemys, reaching an estimated length of 1.2 to 1.5 meters.

== Phylogeny ==
Caninemys shows multiple morphological characters that clearly identify it as a pelomedusoid pleurodire, specifically a podocnemidid. The phylogenetic tree below is based on the initial analysis conducted in 2009.

- - Chelidae
  - - - Araripemys
      - Pelomedusidae
    - - Euraxemys
      - - Bothremydidae
        - - Hamadachelys
          - - Bauruemys
            - - "Roxochelys"
              - - - Podocnemis vogli
                  - - Podocnemis erythrocephala
                    - Podocnemis sextuberculata
                    - Podocnemis expansa
                    - Podocnemis lewyana
                    - Podocnemis unifilis
                - - Caninemys tridentata
                  - - Dacquemys
                    - - - Erymnochelys
                        - Peltocephalus
                      - - Neochelys
                        - - Shweboemys
                          - Stereogenys

The following phylogenetic tree is a simplified version of the one recovered by Cadena et al. (2021), recovering Stupendemys and Caninemys as being quite distant from one another within Podocnemididae. The scoring of this tree was significantly improved through the discovery of additional remains for both taxa. While Stupendemys claded with the extant Big-headed Amazon River turtle, Caninemys was found to be much more basal, being recovered as the sister taxon to the clade that includes both the Stupendemys branch as well as the lineage that leads to the Madagascan big-headed turtle. This was later reaffirmed in the description of Peltocephalus maturin, with the phylogenetic tree of said study being shown below.

- - - Cerrejonemys
    - Podocnemis
  - - Caninemys
    - - - Neochelys arenarum
        - - Neochelys franzeni
          - - - Turkanemys
              - Erymnochelys
            - - Neochelys fajumensis
              - - Papoulemys
                - - Kenyemys
                  - Carbonemys
                  - Dacquemys
                  - UCMP 42008
      - - - Peltocephalus dumerilianus
          - Peltocephalus maturin
        - - Stupendemys
          - - Mogharemys
            - - Cordichelys
              - - Latentemys
                - - Bairdemys healeyorum
                  - - - Brontochelys
                      - - Lemurchelys
                        - - Piramys
                          - Stereogenys
                          - Shweboemys
                    - Bairdemys spp.

== Paleobiology ==
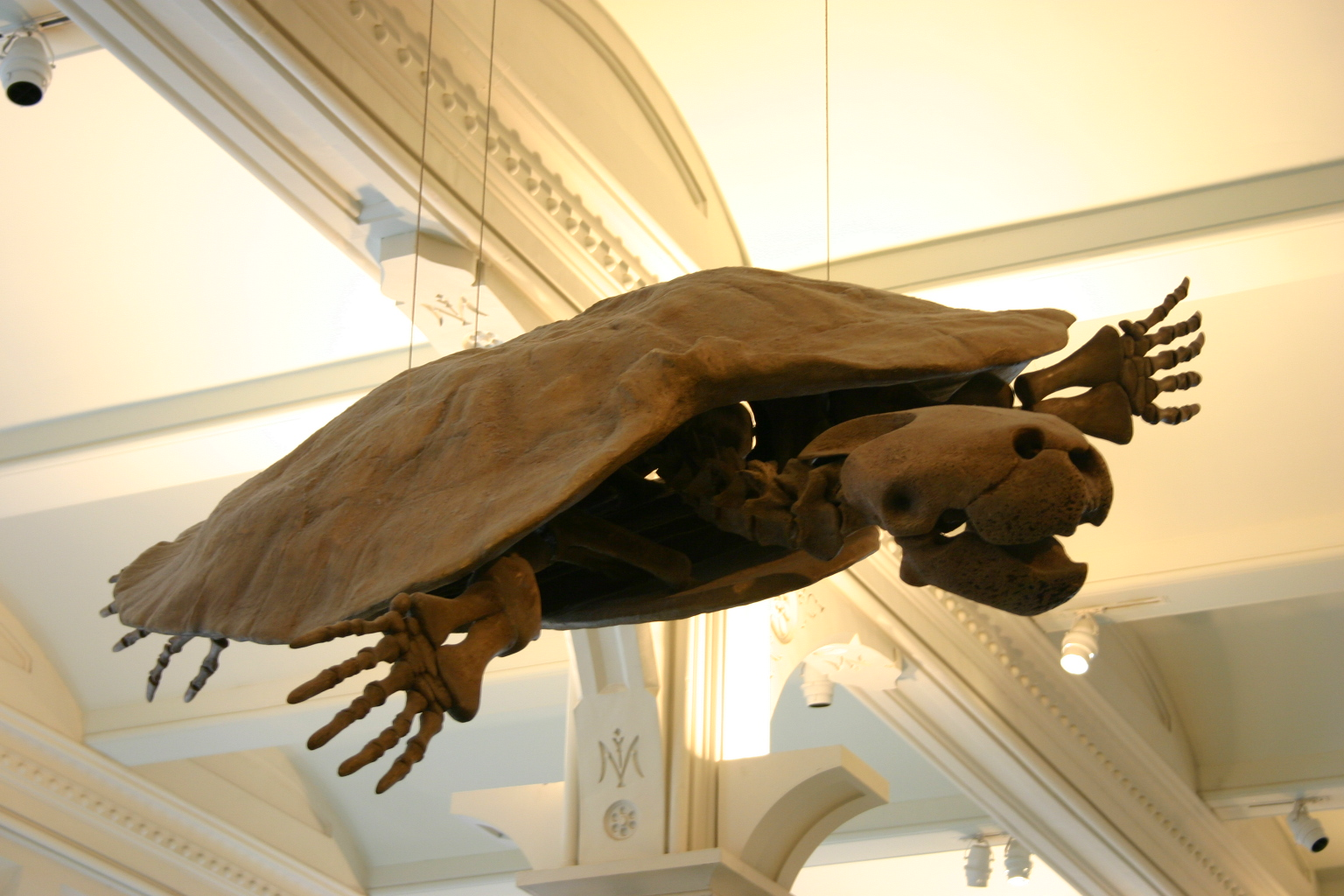
The AMNH Stupendemys, using the skull of Caninemys

The three tooth-like processes of Caninemys are similar to those seen in the living Claudius angustatus, the Narrow-bridged musk turtle, a member of a group known to utilize a specialised hyoid apparatus to capture highly mobile prey via vacuum feeding. Such a feeding style in combination with the massive jaws and tooth-like processes may suggests that it would have been a predatory animal with a lifestyle similar to snapping turtles, feeding on fish, crocodilians and snakes respectively. This hypothesis was later contested by Cadena and colleagues in 2020, who instead proposed that Caninemys (by them treated as a synonym of Stupendemys) had a much broader diet not exclusive to vertebrate prey. However, in their 2021 follow-up paper, Cadena and colleagues once again inferred a more carnivorous, vacuum-feeding strategy for Caninemys in opposition to a generalist/durophagous Stupendemys, arguing that these dietary differences might explain the co-occurrence of two large-bodied turtles within the same ecosystems.
