= 2011 in paleontology =

Paleontology or palaeontology is the study of prehistoric life forms on Earth through the examination of plant and animal fossils. This includes the study of body fossils, tracks (ichnites), burrows, cast-off parts, fossilised feces (coprolites), palynomorphs and chemical residues. Because humans have encountered fossils for millennia, paleontology has a long history both before and after becoming formalized as a science. This article records significant discoveries and events related to paleontology that occurred or were published in the year 2011.

== Protozoa ==
=== New taxa ===
Name	Novelty	Status	Authors	Age	Unit	Location	Notes	Images
Vetufebrus	Gen et sp nov	Valid	Poinar	Burdigalian	Dominican amber	Dominican Republic	A Plasmodiidae vectored by the bat fly Enischnomyia stegosoma	Vetufebrus ovatus

== Plants ==
=== Ferns and fern allies ===
Name	Novelty	Status	Authors	Age	Unit	Location	Synonymized taxa	Notes	Images
Drynaria callispora	Sp nov		Su et al	Pliocene	Sanying Formation	China		A Drynaria species fern	
Equisetum thermale	sp. nov	Valid	Channing, Zamuner, Edwards, & Guido	Callovian - Tithonian	La Matilde Formation	Argentina		oldest crown group Equisetum species	

=== Gymnosperms ===
Name	Novelty	Status	Authors	Age	Unit	Location	Synonymized taxa	Notes	Images
Agathoxylon byeongpungense	comb nov		(Kim et al.) Oh et al.	Cretaceous (Aptian - Albian)	Donghwachi Formation	South Korea		An Araucariaceous wood	
Agathoxylon kiiense	comb nov		(Ogura) Oh et al.	Cretaceous (Aptian - Albian)	Togeum Formation	South Korea		An Araucariaceous wood	
Agathoxylon togeumense	Sp nov		Oh et al.	Cretaceous (Aptian - Albian)	Togeum Formation	South Korea		An Araucariaceous wood	
Cariria	Gen. et sp. nov	Valid	Kunzmann et al.	Aptian	Crato Formation	Brazil		A possible gnetophyte	
Cupressus guangxiensis	Sp nov		Shi et al.	Oligocene	Ningming Formation	China		A cuprecaceous foliage/cone species	
Hughmillerites	Gen et comb nov		Rothwell et al.	Jurassic; Kimmeridgian	Kimmeridge Clay Formation	UK; Scotland	Conites juddii (1913)	A cuprecaceous cone morphotaxon The type species is H. juddii	
Pinus arnoldii	Syn nov	Valid	Miller	Eocene; Ypresian	Allenby Formation; Princeton chert	Canada; British Columbia	Pinus similkameenensis (1973)	A permineralized pine An amplified "whole plant reconstruction" including P. similkameenensis foliage/wood	
Protaxodioxylon turolense	Sp nov		Vozenin-Serra	Cretaceous late Albian	Utrillas Formation	Spain		A cupressaceous wood	
Qataniaria	Gen. et sp.	Valid	Krassilov & Schrank	Albian	Hatira Formation	Israel		A gymnosperm pollen morphotype	
Schizolepis daohugouensis	Sp nov		Zhang et al.	Jurassic	Daohugou flora	China		A pinaceous relative	

==== Gymnosperm research ====
- An amplified whole plant reconstruction of the Ypresian Princeton chert pine Pinus arnoldii, expanding the diagnosis to include P. similkameenensis (Miller, 1973) foliage and wood plus unnamed pollens cones found in attachment to the P. arnoldii ovulate cones is published by Klymiuk, Stockey, & Rothwell.

=== Angiosperms ===
Name	Novelty	Status	Authors	Age	Unit	Location	Synonymized taxa	Notes	Images
Ficus palaeoracemosa	Sp nov		Srivastava, Srivastava, & Mehrotra	Early Miocene	Kasauli Formation	India		A fig leaf morphospecies	
Leefructus	Gen. et sp.	Valid	Sun, Dilcher, Wang, & Chen	Early Cretaceous	Yixian Formation	China		A basal eudicot	
Oemleria janhartfordae	Species	Valid	Benedict, DeVore, & Pigg	Eocene; Ypresian	Okanagan Highlands; Klondike Mountain Formation	USA; Washington		An Osoberry flower	
Palmoxylon lametaei	Species	Valid	Dutta, Ambwani, & Estrada-Ruiz	Maastrichtian	Lameta Formation	India		A palm wood morphospecies	
Prunus cathybrownae	Species	Valid	Benedict, DeVore, & Pigg	Eocene; Ypresian	Okanagan Highlands; Klondike Mountain Formation	USA; Washington		A cherry flower species	Prunus cathybrownae

== Nematoda ==
Name	Novelty	Status	Authors	Age	Unit	Location	Notes	Images
Formicodiplogaster	Gen et sp nov	valid	Poinar	Burdigalian	Dominican amber	Dominican Republic	A diplogasterid nematode The type species is F. myrmenema parasite of Azteca species ants	Formicodiplogaster myrmenema

== Lobopods ==
Name	Novelty	Status	Authors	Age	Unit	Location	Notes	Images
Diania cactiformis		Valid	Liu et al.	Lower Cambrian	Maotianshan shale	China	A lobopodian.	
Mureropodia apae		Valid	Gamez Vintaned, Linan, & Zhuravlev	Early Cambrian	Murero	Spain	A lobopodian.	
Siberion lenaicus		Valid	Dzik	Early Cambrian	Sinsk Formation	Russia	A lobopodian.	

== Vetulicolians ==
Name	Novelty	Status	Authors	Age	Unit	Location	Notes	Images
Ooedigera peeli	gen. nov	valid	Zinther, et al.	Early Cambrian	Sirius Passet	Greenland	earliest known vetulicolian described	Artist's reconstruction

== Amphibians ==
=== Newly named lepospondyls ===
Name	Novelty	Status	Authors	Age	Unit	Location	Notes	Images
Kirktonecta	Gen. et sp.	Valid	Clack	Viséan	East Kirkton Quarry	Scotland	A microsaur.	
Tambaroter	Gen. et sp.	Valid	Henrici; Martens; et al. (Note: Henrici, Martens, Berman, Sumida.)	Early Permian	Tambach Formation	Germany	An ostodolepid.	

=== Newly named temnospondyls ===
Name	Novelty	Status	Authors	Age	Unit	Location	Notes	Images
Acheloma dunni	Species	Valid	Polley; Reisz	Early Permian		USA	A trematopid.	
Calmasuchus	Gen. et sp.	Valid	Fortuny; Galobart; De Santisteban	early-middle Anisian	Catalan basin	Spain	A capitosaurian.	
Rotaryus	Gen. et sp.	Valid	Berman; Henrici; et al. (Note: Berman, Henrici, Martens, Sumida, Anderson)	Early Permian	Tambach Formation	Germany	A trematopid.	
Rubeostratilia	Gen. et sp.	Valid	Bourget; Anderson	Early Permian		USA	An amphibamid.	Rubeostratilia texensis.

=== Newly named lissamphibians ===
Name	Novelty	Status	Authors	Age	Unit	Location	Notes	Images
Urupia	Gen. et sp.	Valid	Skutschas; Krasnolutskii	Bathonian	Itat Formation	Russia	A basal stem salamander.	

== Basal reptiles ==
=== Newly named captorhinids ===
Name	Novelty	Status	Authors	Age	Unit	Location	Notes	Images
Gansurhinus	Gen. et sp.	Valid	Reisz; Liu; et al. (Note: Reisz, Liu, Li, Müller.)	Middle Permian		China	A moradisaurine captorhinid.	

=== Newly named basal diapsids ===
Name	Novelty	Status	Authors	Age	Unit	Location	Notes	Images
Orovenator	Gen. et sp.	Valid	Reisz; Modesto; Scott	Sakmarian		USA	The oldest and most basal neodiapsid.	

=== Newly named ichthyosaurs ===
Name	Novelty	Status	Authors	Age	Unit	Location	Notes	Images
Sveltonectes	Gen. et sp.	Valid	Fischer; Masure; et al. (Note: Fischer, Masure, Arkhangelsky, Godefroit.)	Barremian		Russia	An ophthalmosaurid.	

== Lepidosauromorphs ==
=== Newly named saurosphargids ===
Name	Novelty	Status	Authors	Age	Unit	Location	Notes	Images
Sinosaurosphargis	Gen. et sp.	Valid	Li; Rieppel; et al. (Note: Li, Rieppel, Wu, Zhao, Wang.)	Middle Anisian	Guanling Formation	China	An incertae sedis.	

=== Newly named sauropterygians ===
Name	Novelty	Status	Authors	Age	Unit	Location	Notes	Images
Abyssosaurus	Gen. et sp.	Valid	Berezin	Late Hauterivian		Russia	An aristonectid.	
Diandongosaurus	Gen. et sp.	Valid	Shang; Wu; Li	Middle Anisian	Guanling Formation	China	A relative of nothosauroids.	
Dianopachysaurus	Gen. et sp.	Valid	Liu; Rieppel; et al. (Note: Liu, Rieppel, Jiang, Aitchison, Motani, Zhang, Zhou, Sun.)	Middle Anisian	Guanling Formation	China	A keichousaurid pachypleurosaur.	
Hauffiosaurus tomistomimus	Species	Valid	Benson; Ketchum; et al. (Note: Benson, Ketchum, Noè, Gómez-Pérez.)	Early Toarcian	Whitby Limestone Formation	England	A second species of Hauffiosaurus.	
Marmornectes	Gen. et sp.	Valid	Ketchum; Benson	Callovian	Oxford Clay Formation	United Kingdom	A pliosaurid.	
Westphaliasaurus	Gen. et sp.	Valid	Schwermann; Sander	Pliensbachian	Höxter district	Germany	A plesiosaurid plesiosaur.	
Zarafasaura	Gen. et sp.	Valid	Vincent; Bardet; et al. (Note: Vincent, Bardet, Suberbiola, Bouya, Amaghzaz, Meslouh.)	Maastrichtian		Morocco	An elasmosaurid plesiosaur.	

=== Newly named lizards ===
Name	Novelty	Status	Authors	Age	Unit	Location	Notes	Images
Brasiliguana	Gen. et sp.	Valid	Nava; Martinelli	Turonian/Santonian	Adamantina Formation	Brazil	An iguanian lizard.	
Cryptolacerta	Gen. et sp.	Valid	Müller; Hipsley; et al. (Note: Müller, Hipsley, Head, Kardjilov, Hilger, Wuttke, Reisz.)	Lutetian	Messel pit	Germany	An amphisbaenian lizard.	
Latoplatecarpus	Gen. et sp.	Valid	Konishi; Caldwell	Campanian	Pierre Shale Formation; Demopolis Chalk Formation	Canada; USA	A plioplatecarpine mosasaur. Its type species is Latoplatecarpus willistoni; "Plioplatecarpus" nichollsae (Cuthbertson et al.., 2007) is a second species of Latoplatecarpus.	
Oreithyia	Gen. et sp. nov	Valid	Smith	Eocene (Chadronian)		United States	A member of Corytophanidae. The type species is Oreithyia oaklandi.	
Plesioplatecarpus	Gen. et comb.	Valid	Konishi; Caldwell	Middle Coniacian to middle Santonian.	Niobrara Chalk; Eutaw Formation	USA	A plioplatecarpine mosasaur, a new genus for "Clidastes" planifrons (Cope, 1874).	
Queironius	Gen. et sp. nov	Valid	Smith	Eocene (Chadronian)		United States	A relative of the desert iguana. The type species is Queironius praelapsus.	
Sauropithecoides	Gen. et comb. nov	Valid	Smith	Eocene (Chadronian)		United States	A member of Polychrotidae; a new genus for "Polychrus" charisticus Smith (2006).	

=== Newly named snakes ===
Name	Novelty	Status	Authors	Age	Unit	Location	Notes	Images
Madtsoia pisdurensis	Species	Valid	Mohabey; Head; Wilson	Late Cretaceous		India	A madtsoiid snake.	

== Turtles ==
=== Newly named turtles ===
Name	Novelty	Status	Authors	Age	Unit	Location	Notes	Images
Albertwoodemys	Gen. et sp.	Valid	Gaffney; Meylan; et al. (Note: Gaffney, Meylan, Wood, Simons and Campos)	Early Oligocene	Jebel Qatrani Formation	Egypt	A podocnemidid.	
Brontochelys	Gen. et comb.	Valid	Gaffney; Meylan; et al.	Early Miocene		Pakistan	A podocnemidid, a new genus for "Shweboemys" gaffneyi.	
Cordichelys	Gen. et comb.	Valid	Gaffney; Meylan; et al.	Late Eocene	Qasr el-Sagha beds	Egypt	A podocnemidid, a new genus for "Podocnemis" antiqua.	
Gilmoremys	Gen. et comb.	Valid	Joyce; Lyson	Maastrichtian	Lance Formation; Hell Creek Formation	USA	A softshell turtle, new genus for "Aspideretes" lancensis (Gilmore, 1928).	
Graptemys kerneri	Sp. nov	Valid	Ehret & Bourque	Late Pleistocene		United States	An emydid, a species of Graptemys.	
Hispaniachelys	Gen. et sp.	Valid	Slater; Reolid; et al. (Note: Slater, Reolid, Wood, Schouten and Benton)	Oxfordian	Lorente Formation	Spain	A paracryptodire or a basal testudine.	
Hoplochelys clark	Species	Valid	Joyce; Lyson; et al. (Note: Knauss, Joyce, Lyson and Pearson)	Maastrichtian	Hell Creek Formation	USA	A kinosternoid, a species of Hoplochelys.	
Lapparentemys	Gen. et comb.	Valid	Gaffney; Meylan; et al.	Paleocene	Santa Lucía Formation	Bolivia	A podocnemidid, a new genus for "Roxochelys" vilavilensis.	
Latentemys	Gen. et sp.	Valid	Gaffney; Meylan; et al.	Uncertain, possibly Miocene.	Uncertain, possibly Moghara Formation.	Egypt?	A podocnemidid.	
Lemurchelys	Gen. et sp.	Valid	Gaffney; Meylan; et al.	Early Miocene	Moghara Formation	Egypt	A podocnemidid.	
Mogharemys	Gen. et comb.	Valid	Gaffney; Meylan; et al.	Miocene		Egypt	A podocnemidid, a new genus for "Sternothaerus" blanckenhorni.	
Oliveremys	Gen. et comb. nov.	Valid	Vitek	Eocene	Washakie Formation	USA	A trionychid, a new genus for "Trionyx" uintaensis.	
Patagoniaemys	Gen. et sp.	Valid	Sterli; De la Fuente	Campanian - Maastrichtian	La Colonia Formation	Argentina	A stem turtle.	
Peiropemys	Gen. et sp.	Valid	Gaffney; Meylan; et al.	Late Cretaceous	Marília Formation	Brazil	A podocnemidid.	
Pricemys	Gen. et sp.	Valid	Gaffney; Meylan; et al.	Late Cretaceous	Marília Formation	Brazil	A podocnemidid.	
Prochelidella cerrobarcinae	Species	Valid	de la Fuente; Umazano; et al. (Note: de la Fuente, Umazano, Sterli and Carballido)	Aptian/Albian	Cerro Barcino Formation	Argentina	The oldest known chelid, a species of Prochelidella.	
Selenemys	Gen. et sp.	Valid	Pérez-García; Ortega	Upper Kimmeridgian	Lusitanian Basin	Portugal	A pleurosternid.	
Sokatra	Gen. et sp.	Valid	Gaffney; Krause	Maastrichtian	Maevarano Formation	Madagascar	A pleurodiran.	
Trionyx ikoviensis	Species	Valid	Danilov; Zvonok; et al. (Note: Danilov, Zvonok, Syromyatnikova and Udovichenko)	Middle Eocene		Ukraine	A species of Trionyx sensu lato.	
Wilburemys	Gen. et sp. nov	Valid	Martin & Mallory	Late Miocene-Pliocene (Hemphillian-Blancan)	Ellensburg Formation	USA; Washington	An emydine Emydidae pond turtle. The type species is W. yakimensis.	

== Archosauromorphs ==
=== Newly named basal archosauromorphs ===
Name	Novelty	Status	Authors	Age	Unit	Location	Notes	Images
Archeopelta	Gen. et sp.	Valid	Desojo; Ezcurra; Schultz	Late Ladinian/Early Carnian	Santa Maria Formation	Brazil	A member of Archosauriformes of uncertain phylogenetic placement. Originally classified as a doswelliid, but subsequently argued to be an erpetosuchid archosaur.	Archeopelta arborensis
Augustaburiania	Gen. et sp.	Valid	Sennikov	Early Triassic	Don River Basin	Russia	The earliest tanystropheid.	
Kyrgyzsaurus	Gen. et sp.	Valid	Alifanov; Kurochkin	Late Ladinian/Early Carnian	Madygen Formation	Kyrgyzstan	The earliest drepanosaurid.	
Protanystropheus	Gen. et comb.	Valid	Sennikov	Middle - Late Triassic		Austria; Germany; Netherlands; Poland	A tanystropheid, a new genus for "Tanystropheus" antiquus (von Huene, 1905).	

== Synapsids ==
=== Newly named non-mammalian synapsids ===
Name	Novelty	Status	Authors	Age	Unit	Location	Notes	Images
Annatherapsidus postum	Sp.	Valid	Ivakhnenko	Late Permian		Russia	A therocephalian.	
Basilodon	Gen. et comb.	Valid	Kammerer; Angielczyk; Fröbisch	Late Permian		South Africa	A dicynodont. A new genus for "Dicynodon" woodwardi.	
Bridetherium	Gen. et sp.	Valid	Clemens	Early Jurassic		United Kingdom	A morganucodontan.	
Candelariodon	Gen. et sp.	Valid	De Oliveira; Schultz; et al. (Note: De Oliveira, Schultz, Soares, Rodrigues.)	Middle Triassic	Santa Maria Formation	Brazil	A carnivorous cynodont.	
Cryptovenator	Gen. et sp.	Valid	Fröbisch; Schoch; et al. (Note: Fröbisch, Schoch, Müller, Schindler, Schweiss.)	Late Gzhelian	Remigiusberg Formation	Germany	A sphenacodontid pelycosaur. The type species is Cryptovenator hirschbergeri.	
Euptychognathus	Gen. et comb.	Valid	Kammerer; Angielczyk; Fröbisch	Late Permian		South Africa	A dicynodont. A new genus for "Dicynodon" bathyrhynchus.	
Euromycter	Gen. et comb.	Valid	Reisz; Maddin; et al. (Note: Reisz, Maddin, Fröbisch, Falconnet.)	Upper Sakmarian - Lower Lopingian	Grès Rouge Group	France	A large caseid. A new genus for "Casea" rutena.	
Gorochovetzia	Gen. et sp.	Valid	Ivakhnenko	Late Permian		Russia	A therocephalian.	
Keyseria	Gen. et comb.	Valid	Kammerer; Angielczyk; Fröbisch	Late Permian		South Africa	A dicynodont. A new genus for "Dicynodon" benjamini.	
Muchia	Gen. et sp.	Valid	Ivakhnenko	Late Permian		Russia	A therocephalian.	
Paceyodon	Gen. et sp.	Valid	Clemens	Early Jurassic		United Kingdom	A morganucodontan.	
Peramodon	Gen. et comb.	Valid	Kammerer; Angielczyk; Fröbisch	Late Permian		Russia	A dicynodont. A new genus for "Dicynodon" amalitzkii	
Perplexisaurus lepusculus	Species	Valid	Ivakhnenko	Middle Permian		Russia	A therocephalian.	
Purlovia	Gen. et sp.	Valid	Ivakhnenko	Late Permian		Russia	A therocephalian with a short skull.	Purlovia
Ruthenosaurus	Gen. et sp.	Valid	Reisz; Maddin; et al.	Upper Sakmarian - Lower Lopingian	Grès Rouge Group	France	A large caseid. The type species is Ruthenosaurus russellorum	
Syops	Gen. et comb.	Valid	Kammerer; Angielczyk; Fröbisch	Late Permian		South Africa	A dicynodont. A new genus for "Dicynodon" vanhoepeni.	
Tiarajudens	Gen. et sp.	Valid	Cisneros; Abdala; et al. (Note: Cisneros, Abdala, Rubidge, Dentzien-Dias, Bueno.)	Capitanian	Rio do Rasto Formation	Brazil	A basal, saber-toothed herbivorous anomodont. The type species is Tiarajudens eccentricus.	

== Footnotes ==
=== Complete author list ===
As science becomes more collaborative, papers with large numbers of authors are becoming more common. To prevent the deformation of the tables, these footnotes list the contributors to papers that erect new genera and have many authors.
