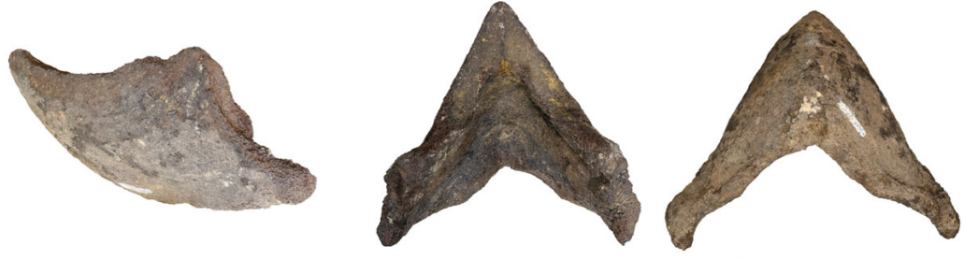
- The holotype mandible of P. maturin seen from three different angles.
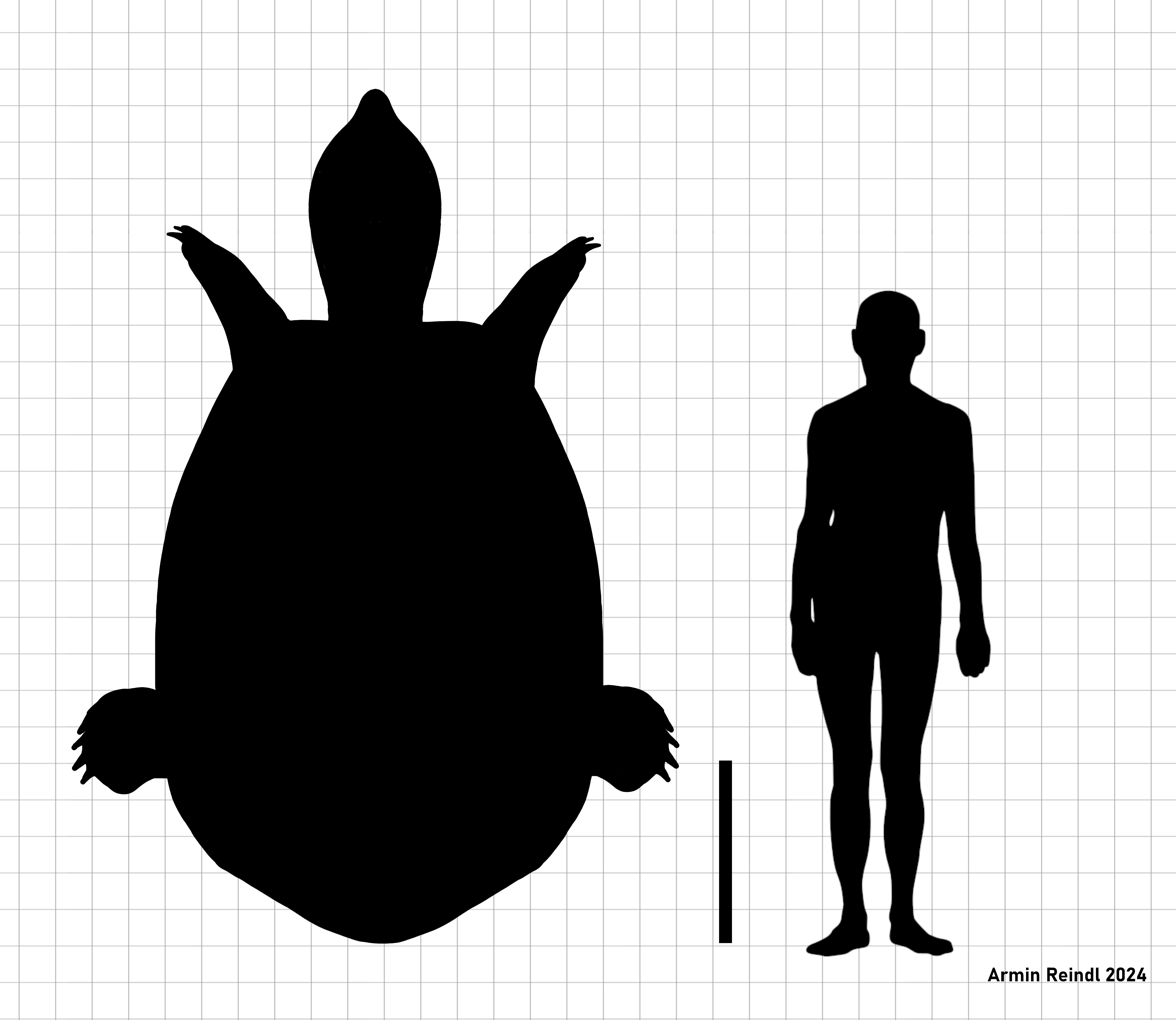
- Size comparison with a human

Conservation status
- Extinct (IUCN 3.1)

Scientific classification
- Kingdom: Animalia
- Phylum: Chordata
- Class: Reptilia
- Order: Testudines
- Suborder: Pleurodira
- Family: Podocnemididae
- Genus: Peltocephalus
- Species: †P. maturin

Binomial name
- †Peltocephalus maturin Ferreira et al., 2024

= Peltocephalus maturin =

Peltocephalus maturin Temporal range: Late Pleistocene - Early Holocene 0.014–0.009 Ma

Extinct species of turtle

Peltocephalus maturin is an extinct species of podocnemidid river turtle closely related to the big-headed Amazon River turtle (Peltocephalus dumerilianus) that lived during the Late Pleistocene and Early Holocene in what is now Brazil. P. maturin is known from a singular lower jaw of enormous size, with estimates suggesting its carapace may have reached lengths around 1.70 m (5 ft 7 in). This would make it one of the largest freshwater turtles in history, comparable in size to the Paleocene podocnemidid Carbonemys and only exceeded by the Miocene podocnemidid Stupendemys. Like its closest relative, it was likely an omnivore, the narrow cutting surface of its lower jaw unsuited for strict herbivory or durophagy.

== History and naming ==
Peltocephalus maturin was described in 2024 on the basis of specimen MERO.PV.H 007, a partial lower jaw discovered by gold miners within the Taquaras Quarry of Rondônia, Brazil. Since the Rio Madeira Formation is the only geological unit exposed at this quarry, the fossil is subsequently assumed to be Late Pleistocene to Early Holocene in age.

The species name references Maturin, a recurring entity in the works of Stephen King said to be a giant turtle that created the universe. King, in turn, derived the name from the character of Stephen Maturin from Patrick O'Brian's novel HMS Surprise, in which he names a giant tortoise.

== Description ==
Although the type material of P. maturin is restricted to an incomplete mandible, much information has been derived from this material. The mandibular symphysis is fused, clearly placing the animal within Pelomedusoides. The labial and lingual ridges, which are located to either side of the triturating (cutting or grinding) surface of the lower jaw, are straight, which sets them apart from the curved ridges seen in species of Podocnemis, the South American river turtles. It further differs from species of that genus by having a U-shaped outline of the midline of the lingual ridges and a lingual platform located towards the back on the mandible, ventrally (below) to the triturating surface and the symphyseal fossa. This fossa contains two pits, which can be used to differentiate the mandible of P. maturin from the extant Madagascan big-headed turtle of the genus Erymnochelys. Impressions left by the rhamphotheca, the outermost keratinous layer of the beak, indicate that its back edge sloped dorsoventrally (from the top to the bottom of the jaw), whereas in both Podocnemis and Erymnochelys, it slopes posteroventrally, meaning both down and towards the back of the jaw. A striking feature of P. maturin is the greatly enlarged symphyseal hook formed at the tip of the lower jaw. The fact that this hook ends above the coronoid process, together with the lingual platform and the presence of two pits located within the symphyseal fossa, clearly identify it as a relative of the big-headed Amazon River turtle, thus its placement within the genus Peltocephalus.

In addition to size, P. maturin can be differentiated from its modern relative by the labial ridge that stretches closer to the outer surface of the dentary is higher up than the lingual (inner) ridge. Also unlike its modern relative, the two triturating surfaces enclosed by these ridges do not meet in the middle, as they are separated by a symphyseal ridge that stretches along the midline of the dentary. Additionally, each triturating surface can be divided into an anterior and posterior section, divided by a secondary ridge that runs at a right angle to the triturating surface. Ferreira and colleagues note that these features except for the presence of a secondary ridge are also shared by the enormous Miocene Stupendemys. However, Stupendemys and P. maturin differ in that the latter has a more upturned symphyseal hook, narrower triturating surfaces. and lower lingual ridges that form a V-shape towards the tip of the mandible, rather than the protruding ridges in Stupendemys that form a U-shape.

One of the most notable things about P. maturin is the size of the holotype mandible. The dentary measures 27.8 cm (10.9 in) in length, which is comparable to that of the Cretaceous marine turtle Archelon. Total length estimates were conducted through two approaches, both yielding similar results. Approach 1 suggests an estimated straight carapace length around 1.70 m (5 ft 7 in), while approach 2 yielded a slightly longer 1.73 m (5 ft 8 in). The lower and upper bounds lie between roughly 1.40 and 2.16 m (4 ft 7 in and 7 ft 1 in). While this would put the total length of P. maturin below those of giants Archelon and Stupendemys, it would still be one of the largest freshwater turtles in terms of carapace length, matched only by Carbonemys (estimated straight carapace length 1.8 m (5 ft 11 in)). It also far exceeds any other freshwater turtle of the Quaternary, such as the Asian narrow-headed softshell turtle (straight carapace length 1.40 m (4 ft 7 in)) and the Arrau turtle (straight carapace length 1.09 m (3 ft 7 in)).

== Phylogeny ==
Phylogenetic analysis confirmed the relationship between P. maturin and P. dumerilianus, both of which forming a clade that is deeply nested within the Podocnemididae. The levels of resolution do differ between the two analyses conducted, with the strict consensus being poorly resolved, though still supporting the clade formed by the two Peltocephalus species. The Majority Rule Tree, depicted below, yielded better resolved results that are in line with the internal relationships that were recovered by previous studies. Within this tree, Peltocephalus species are the basal-most offshoot of a branch that also includes Stupendemys and the various species of Bairdemys, together forming one of two distinct branches within the Erymnochelyinae.

- - Podocnemididae
    - Podocnemidinae
      - †Cerrejonemys
      - Podocnemis
    - Erymnochelyinae
      - †Caninemys
      - - - †Neochelys arenarum
          - - †Neochelys franzeni
            - - - †Turkanemys
                - Erymnochelys
              - - †Neochelys fajumensis
                - - †Papoulemys
                  - - †Kenyemys
                    - †Carbonemys
                    - †Dacquemys
                    - †UCMP 42008
        - - - Peltocephalus dumerilianus
            - †Peltocephalus maturin
          - - †Stupendemys
            - Stereogenyini
              - †Mogharemys
              - - †Cordichelys
                - - †Latentemys
                  - - †Bairdemys healeyorum
                    - - - †Brontochelys
                        - - †Lemurchelys
                          - - †Piramys
                            - †Stereogenys
                            - †Shweboemys
                      - †Bairdemys spp.

== Paleobiology ==
Diet in turtles can generally be inferred based on the height of the skull, as well as the proportions and complexity of the triturating surface, which is used to cut and grind food. In this regard, P. maturin bears close resemblance to its modern relative. Overall, podocnemidids are omnivores that consume varying levels of plant material, with P. dumerilianus incorporating the greatest amount of animal matter into its diet, including apple snails. This is expressed through a much simpler triturating surface than those seen in more herbivorous podocnemidids. The narrow triturating surface of P. maturin is not especially well suited for durophagy nor herbivory, but at the same time, the midline ridge that separates the triturating surfaces from each other does suggest slightly less carnivorous habits than those of P. dumerilianus.

The great size of this species might have been a factor that allowed it to fill a different niche from other podocnemidids, which has been a proposed factor in the coexistence of the large-bodied Caninemys and Stupendemys during the Miocene and could also be responsible for the coexistence of today's Amazonian podocnemidids. The evolution of such a large bodysize further matches certain patterns within reptile evolutions, with prior size increases being noted to have taken place during the Paleogene in podocnemidids and snakes (such as Titanoboa), as well as during the Miocene with podocnemidids and crocodilians (such as Purussaurus). The discovery of P. maturin matches the great size seen in certain Quaternary squamates including the varanid megalania (Varanus priscus), the teiid Tupinambis uruguaianensis, and the madtsoiid Wonambi. Other testudines reached massive sizes during this time, as well, such as Megalochelys atlas.

== Extinction ==
Ferreira and colleagues speculate that the extinction of P. maturin may have been tied to exploitation by humans. Part of their reasoning is based on the extinction of various island species such as the turtles of the Turks and Caicos Islands, as well as the meiolanids of Vanuatu and New Caledonia, which are often thought to have been driven to extinction by human overhunting. Some of the earliest evidence for humans arriving in South America dates to roughly 12.6 to 9.8 thousand years BP, so overlap with the presence of P. maturin. Furthermore, sites that show signs of human habitation also preserve the remains of both tortoises and podocnemidids, with even modern humans still hunting turtles for their meat. At the same time, no evidence has been found that humans and P. maturin ever actually coexisted, meaning that the reason for this species' extinction remains uncertain until the discovery of better materials provides more clues.
