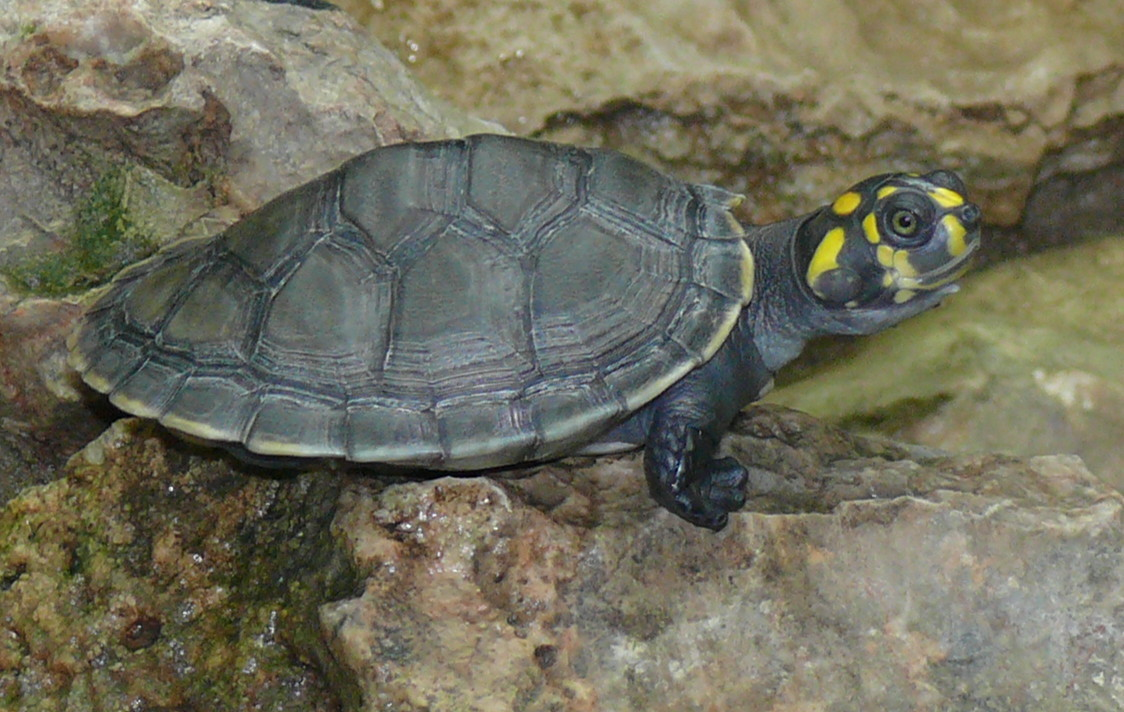
- Yellow-spotted river turtle (Podocnemis unifilis)

Scientific classification
- Kingdom: Animalia
- Phylum: Chordata
- Class: Reptilia
- Order: Testudines
- Suborder: Pleurodira
- Clade: Podocnemidoidae
- Family: Podocnemididae; Cope, 1868

Extant genera
- Erymnochelys; Peltocephalus; Podocnemis; For fossil genera see text

Synonyms
- Podocnemidinae

= Podocnemididae =

Podocnemididae Temporal range: Late Cretaceous to present, 84.9–0 Ma

Family of turtles

Podocnemididae is a family of pleurodire (side-necked) turtles, once widely distributed. Most of its 41 genera and 57 species are now extinct. Seven of its eight surviving species are native to South America: the genus Peltocephalus, with two species, only one of which is extant (P. dumerilianus, the Big-headed Amazon River turtle); and the genus Podocnemis, with six living species of South American side-necked river turtles and four extinct. There is also one genus native to Madagascar: Erymnochelys, containing a single species, the critically endangered Madagascan big-headed turtle (E. madagascariensis).

Like other pleurodire turtles, podocs have a "side-necked" defensive posture, turning the head sideways to hide it under the shell. Another characteristic of pleurodires is that the pelvis is fused to the shell which prevents pelvic motion, making it difficult to walk on land. Podocnemididae turtles live in aquatic environments and have shells streamlined to aid in swimming.

The family notably contains the largest freshwater turtle to have ever lived, Stupendemys, which lived in South America during the Miocene epoch.

== Taxonomy and systematics ==
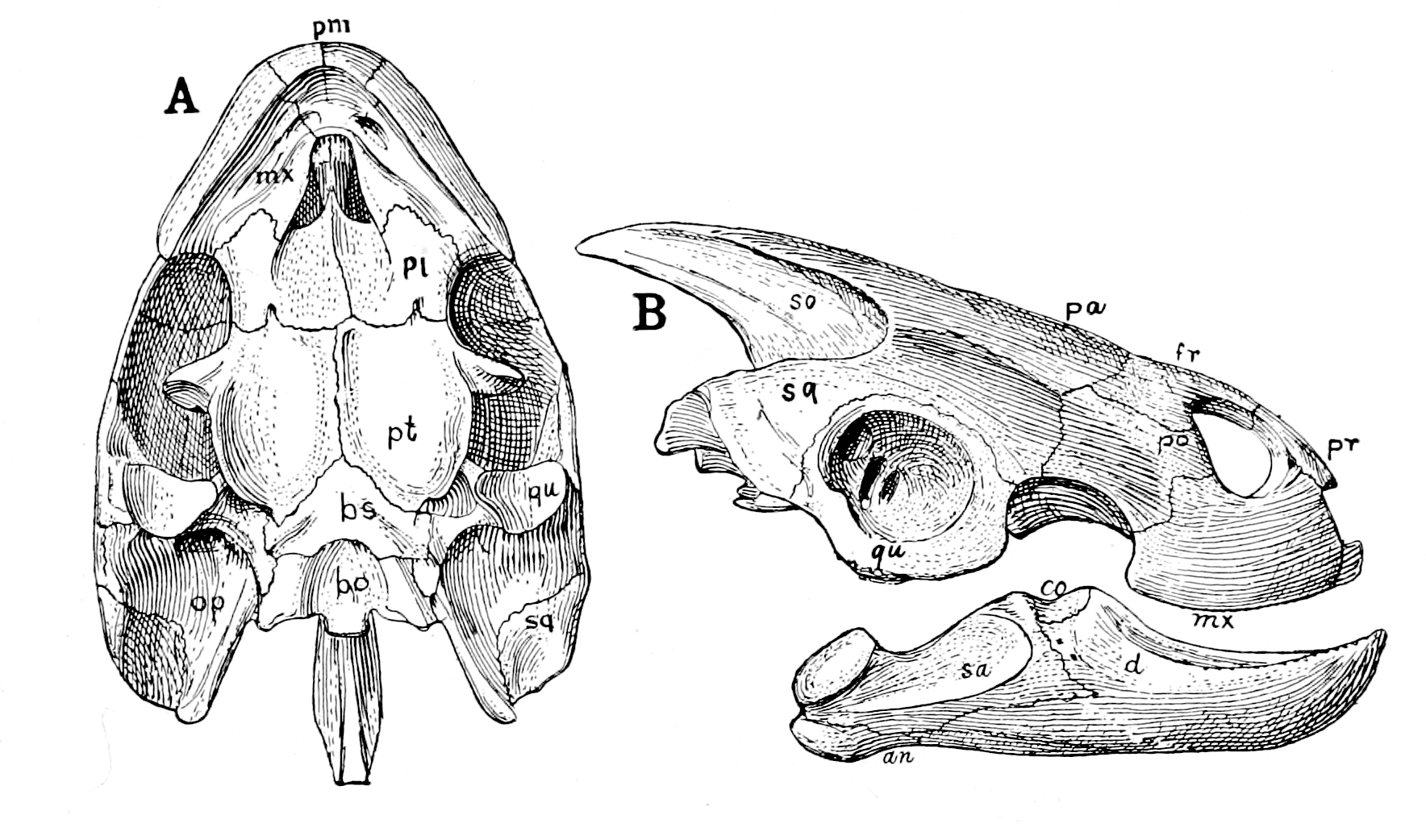
Podocnemis skulls, ventral and side view, with pterygoid and basisphenoid bones labeled "pt" and "bs" respectively.

According to Ferreira et al. (2015), the family name derives from two Greek words: "podos" (foot) and "cnemis" (leg armor worn by Roman soldiers.)

To clarify some closely related names:

- Podocnemidae (Baur, 1893) is an alternate but less commonly used name for the same biological group as family Podocnemididae (Cope, 1868).
- Epifamily Podocnemidinura: The family Podocnemididae has two sister families (Hamadachelys and Brasilemys); the relationship of these three families is sometimes recognized by grouping them as the epifamily Podocnemidinura.
- Superfamily Podocnemidoidea: At a higher level yet, the epifamily Podocnemidinura is grouped with the family Bothremydidae to form the superfamily Podocnemidoidea.
- Podocnemidinae: An earlier classification, rejected by Gaffney, treated Podocnemididae as a subfamily (Podocnemidinae) within the closely related family Pelomedusidae.)

According to Gaffney et al. (2011), the family Podocnemididae can be diagnosed from its cranial traits including "the unique possession of a cavum pterygoidei formed by the basisphenoid, pterygoid, prootic, and quadrate [bones], underlain by the pterygoid and basisphenoid."

The pocnemid family dates to the late Cretaceous; it includes 20 genera and 30 species. Only three genera (and eight species) survive.

The three living genera of Podocnemididae (one of which is monotypic) are:

- Erymnochelys – Madagascan big-headed turtle
- Peltocephalus
  - Peltocephalus dumerilianus – Big-headed Amazon River turtle
  - †Peltocephalus maturin Late Pleistocene
- Podocnemis – South American side-necked river turtles

=== Taxonomy ===
Fossils show that podocnemidids were once found in Europe, Asia, North America, and Africa. Stupendemys lived around 5.5 million years ago in northern South America, and was the largest freshwater turtle with a carapace length of 2.4 metres (7.9 ft), the largest of any known turtle and is the largest pleurodire known. While Peltocephalus and Erymnochelys have often been recovered as more closely related to each other than to Podocnemis in morphological analyses, genetic studies have found Erymochelys to be more closely related to Podocnemis than to Peltocephalus.

All extant podocnemidids inhabit freshwater environments, as did most fossil members, but the extinct tribe Stereogenyini are though to have inhabited marine environments, although they appear to have been restricted to shallow coastal habitats. This is comparable to the Bothremydidae, another extinct group of side-necked turtles that are also known to have inhabited marine environments.

Genera:

- Stem group taxa (Podocnemidoidae)
  - †Brasilemys Romualdo Formation, Brazil, Early Cretaceous (Albian)
  - †Amabilis São José do Rio Preto Formation, Brazil, Late Cretaceous (Santonian)
  - †Hamadachelys Kem Kem Group, Morocco, Late Cretaceous (Cenomanian)
  - †Portezueloemys Portezuelo Formation, Argentina, Late Cretaceous (Turonian)
  - †Cambaremys Marília Formation, Brazil, Late Cretaceous (Maastrichtian)
  - †Bauruemys Presidente Prudente Formation, Brazil, Late Cretaceous (Campanian)
  - †Roxochelys Adamantina Formation, Brazil, Campanian
  - Family †Peiropemydidae
    - †Peiropemys Marília Formation, Brazil, Maastrichtian
    - †Pricemys Marília Formation, Brazil, Maastrichtian
    - †Lapparentemys Santa Lucía Formation, Bolivia, Paleocene
    - †Yuraramirim Adamantina Formation, Brazil, Campanian
  - Family Podocnemididae (crown group)
  - †Caninemys Northern South America, Miocene
    - Subfamily Podocnemidinae
      - †Cerrejonemys Cerrejón Formation, Colombia, Paleocene
      - Podocnemis South America, Miocene-Recent
    - Subfamily Erymnochelyinae
      - †Gestemys Geste Formation, Argentina, Eocene
      - †Stupendemys Northern South America, Miocene
      - †Carbonemys Cerrejón Formation, Colombia, Paleocene
      - Peltocephalus Northern South America, Late Pleistocene-Recent
      - †Ragechelus Farin-Doutchi Formation, Niger, Maastrichtian
      - Erymnochelyini (formerly the "Erymnochelys group")
        - †Apeshemys (formerly "Podocnemis" aegyptiaca) Egypt, Early Miocene
        - †Eocenochelus Eocene, Europe
        - Erymnochelys Madagascar, Recent
        - †Shetwemys (formerly "Podocnemis" fajumensis) Jebel Qatrani Formation, Egypt, Oligocene Shumaysi Formation, Saudi Arabia, Oligocene
        - †Turkanemys Kenya, Miocene-Pliocene
        - †Kenyemys Kenya, Miocene-Pliocene
        - †Mokelemys Democratic Republic of the Congo, Pliocene
      - Stereogenyini
        - †Stereogenys cromeri Qasr el Sagha Formation, Egypt, Late Eocene
        - †Andrewsemys (formerly "Stereogenys" libyca) Egypt, Late Eocene-Early Oligocene
        - †Cordichelys Egypt, Late Eocene
        - †Lemurchelys Moghara Formation, Egypt, Early Miocene
        - †"Podocnemis" bramlyi Moghara Formation, Egypt, Early Miocene
        - †Latentemys Egypt, Miocene
        - †Bairdemys Late Oligocene-Miocene, Americas
        - †Brontochelys Bugti Hills, Pakistan Early Miocene
        - †Shweboemys Pliocene-Pleistocene, Myanmar
        - †Piramys India, Late Miocene
        - †Syriemys Syria, early Eocene
      - Incertae sedis
        - †Neochelys Eocene, Europe
        - †"Stereogenys" podocnemoides Qasr el Sagha Formation, Egypt, Late Eocene
        - †Dacquemys Birket Qarun Formation, Egypt, Late Eocene, Jebel Qatrani Formation, Egypt, Early Oligocene
        - †Albertwoodemys Jebel Qatrani Formation, Egypt, Oligocene
        - †Mogharemys Moghara Formation, Egypt, Early Miocene

Morphology based cladogram after Ferreira et al. 2024

- - Podocnemididae
    - Podocnemidinae
      - †Cerrejonemys
      - Podocnemis
    - Erymnochelyinae
      - †Caninemys
      - - - †Neochelys arenarum
          - - †Neochelys franzeni
            - - - †Turkanemys
                - Erymnochelys
              - - †Neochelys fajumensis
                - - †Papoulemys
                  - - †Kenyemys
                    - †Carbonemys
                    - †Dacquemys
                    - †UCMP 42008
        - - - Peltocephalus dumerilianus
            - †Peltocephalus maturin
          - - †Stupendemys
            - Stereogenyini
              - †Mogharemys
              - - †Cordichelys
                - - †Latentemys
                  - - †Bairdemys healeyorum
                    - - - †Brontochelys
                        - - †Lemurchelys
                          - - †Piramys
                            - †Stereogenys
                            - †Shweboemys
                      - †Bairdemys spp.
