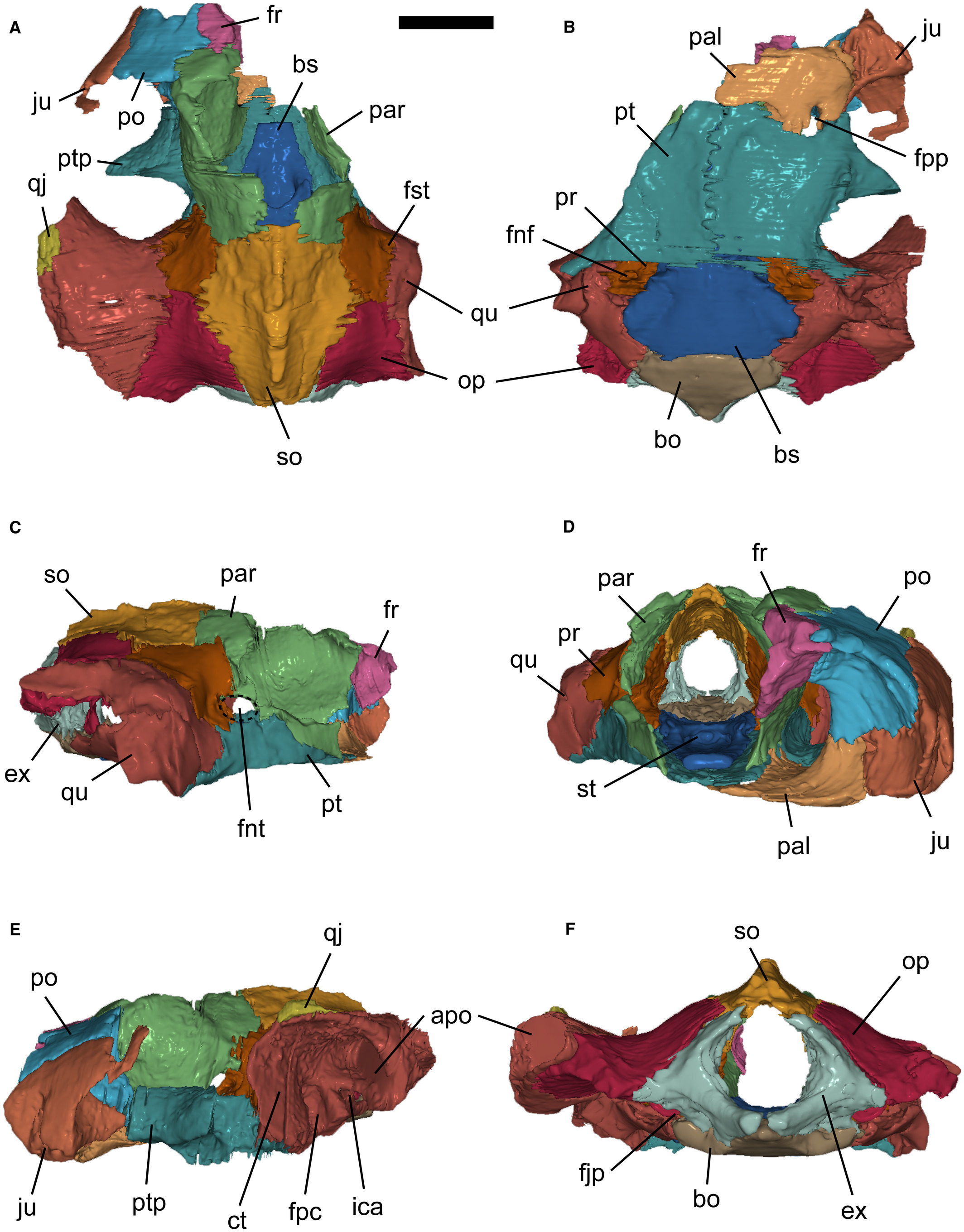
- Amabilis uchoensis skull CT scan in dorsal (top left), ventral (top right), right lateral (centre left), anterior (centre right), left lateral (bottom left) and posterior (bottom right) views

Scientific classification
- Domain: Eukaryota
- Kingdom: Animalia
- Phylum: Chordata
- Class: Reptilia
- Order: Testudines
- Suborder: Pleurodira
- Hyperfamily: Pelomedusoides
- Clade: Podocnemidoidae
- Genus: †Amabilis; Hermanson et al., 2020
- Species: †A. uchoensis

Binomial name
- †Amabilis uchoensis Hermanson et al., 2020

= Amabilis uchoensis =

Amabilis uchoensis Temporal range: Santonian ~86.3–83.6 Ma

Extinct species of turtles

Amabilis uchoensis is a species of prehistoric pleurodiran turtle from the Late Cretaceous of South America. It is the only species in the genus Amabilis.

== Description ==
Hermanson et al. (2020) described the Late Cretaceous turtle Amabilis uchoensis based on a single partial skull from the São José do Rio Preto Formation, in the Brazilian state of São Paulo. The São José do Rio Preto Formation is thought to have been deposited during the Santonian age of the Late Cretaceous, between 86.3 and 83.6 million years ago.

The type-specimen skull, which is 2.25 cm long and 2.06 cm wide, suggests that the animal was smaller than any other fossil turtles found in Brazil's Bauru Group. Modern Brazilian river turtles are also considerably larger, ranging in length from 34 cm (Podocnemis erythrocephala) to 90 cm (Podocnemis expansa.) This skull is deposited in Uchoa's Museum of Paleontology.

The fossil is in the suborder Pleurodira, also known as "side-necked turtles" because their defensive posture hides the head under the shell by pulling the head to one side, rather than by withdrawing the head directly back under the shell.

The Amabilis genus is part of the superfamily or pan-group Podocnemidoidae, which groups the family Podocnemididae together with some related extinct genera, as well as the extinct family Peiropemydidae. Podocnemidoids, first seen in the Late Cretaceous, were once widely distributed across "North and South America, Europe, Asia, and Africa," according to Gaffney et al. (2011.) No surviving turtle species descend directly from Amabilis, which is therefore considered to be a stem group within its family and super-family. Because it is a member of Podocnemidoidae but not a member of the Podocnemididae. Hermanson et al. describe it as "a non-podocnemidid member of Podocnemidoidae."

According to the local newspaper Diário da Região, A. uchoensis was the first fossil turtle found in the São José do Rio Preto region (near the city of São Paulo). The turtle skull fragment was found by Brazilian paleontologist Fabiano Vidoi Iori, very near to the 2014 discovery site of carnivorous dinosaur Thanos simonattoi.

== Name ==
The name Amabilis, according to Hermanson et al., is from the "Latin for 'lovable', for its tiny size."
