= Leefructus =

Leefructus Temporal range: Early Cretaceous, 124.5 Ma

Scientific classification
- Kingdom: Plantae
- (unranked): Angiosperms
- (unranked): Eudicots
- Order: Ranunculales
- Family: incertae sedis (probably Ranunculaceae)
- Genus: Leefructus Sun et al., 2011

Species
- L. mirus Sun et al., 2011 (type)

Extinct genus of eudicot plants

Leefructus is an extinct genus of eudicot plants which existed in Yixian Formation, China during the early Cretaceous period. It was first named by Ge Sun, David L. Dilcher, Hongshan Wang and Zhiduan Chen in 2011 and the type species is Leefructus mirus.
