= Gestemys =

Gestemys Temporal range: Priabonian

Scientific classification
- Kingdom: Animalia
- Phylum: Chordata
- Class: Reptilia
- Order: Testudines
- Suborder: Pleurodira
- Family: Podocnemididae
- Genus: †Gestemys
- Species: †G. powelli

Binomial name
- †Gestemys powelli De la Fuente et al., 2022

Gestemys is an extinct genus of podocnemidid that lived during the Eocene epoch.

== Distribution ==
Gestemys powelli fossils are known from the Geste Formation of Argentina.
