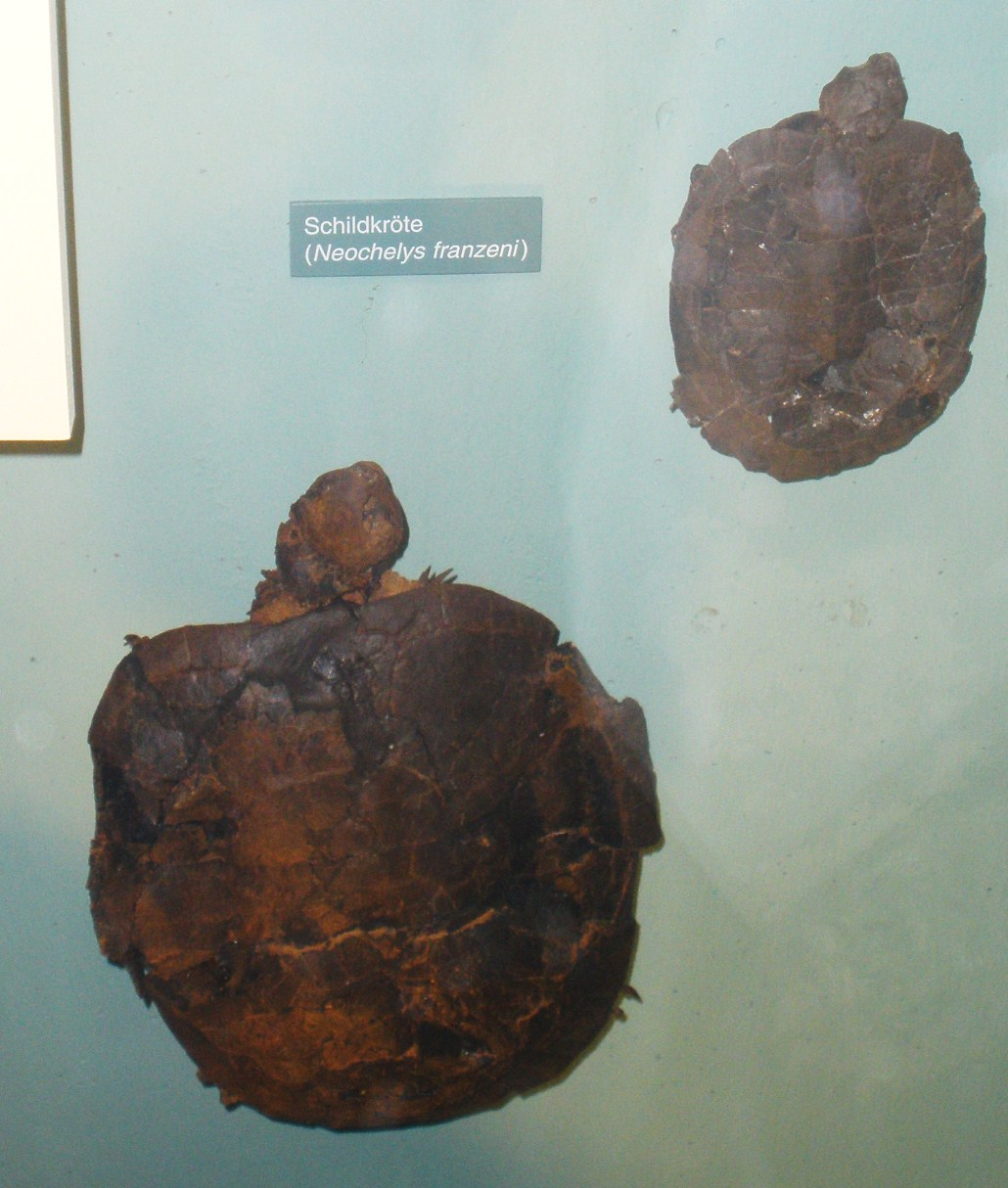
- N. franzeni specimens at the Senckenberg Museum

Scientific classification
- Kingdom: Animalia
- Phylum: Chordata
- Class: Reptilia
- Order: Testudines
- Suborder: Pleurodira
- Family: Podocnemididae
- Subfamily: Erymnochelyinae
- Genus: †Neochelys; Bergounioux, 1954

Type species
- †Emys capellinii de Zigno, 1890

Species
- See text

= Neochelys =

Neochelys Temporal range: Early to Late Eocene

Extinct genus of turtles

Neochelys (Greek for "new turtle") is an extinct genus of freshwater side-necked turtle that inhabited Europe during the Eocene. It was a diverse genus known throughout western and southern Europe from the Ypresian to the Priabonian.

== Taxonomy ==
The following species are known:

- †N. arenarum de Broin, 1977 – early-mid Ypresian of France (Lignites de Soissonais)
- †N. arribasi (Jiménez-Fuentes, 1975) - Bartonian or Priabonian of Spain (Aldearrubia Formation)
- †N. capellinii (de Zigno, 1890) (type species) – latest Ypresian or earliest Lutetian of Italy (Monte Bolca) (=Emys capellinii)
- †N. eocaenica (de Stefano, 1902) – latest Ypresian or earliest Lutetian of France (Grès d'Aigne Formation)
- †N. franzeni Schleich, 1993 – early Lutetian of Germany (Messel Formation)
- †N. laurenti Tong, 1998 – mid-late Ypresian of France (Saint-Papoul Formation)
- †N. liriae Pérez-García & de Broin, 2013 – mid-late Ypresian of France (Grès d'Assignan Formation)
- †N. salmanticensis Jiménez-Fuentes, 1971 – Bartonian of Spain (=Podocnemis carbajosai)
- †N. zamorensis Jiménez-Fuentes, 1992 – late Lutetian of Spain (Entrala Formation)

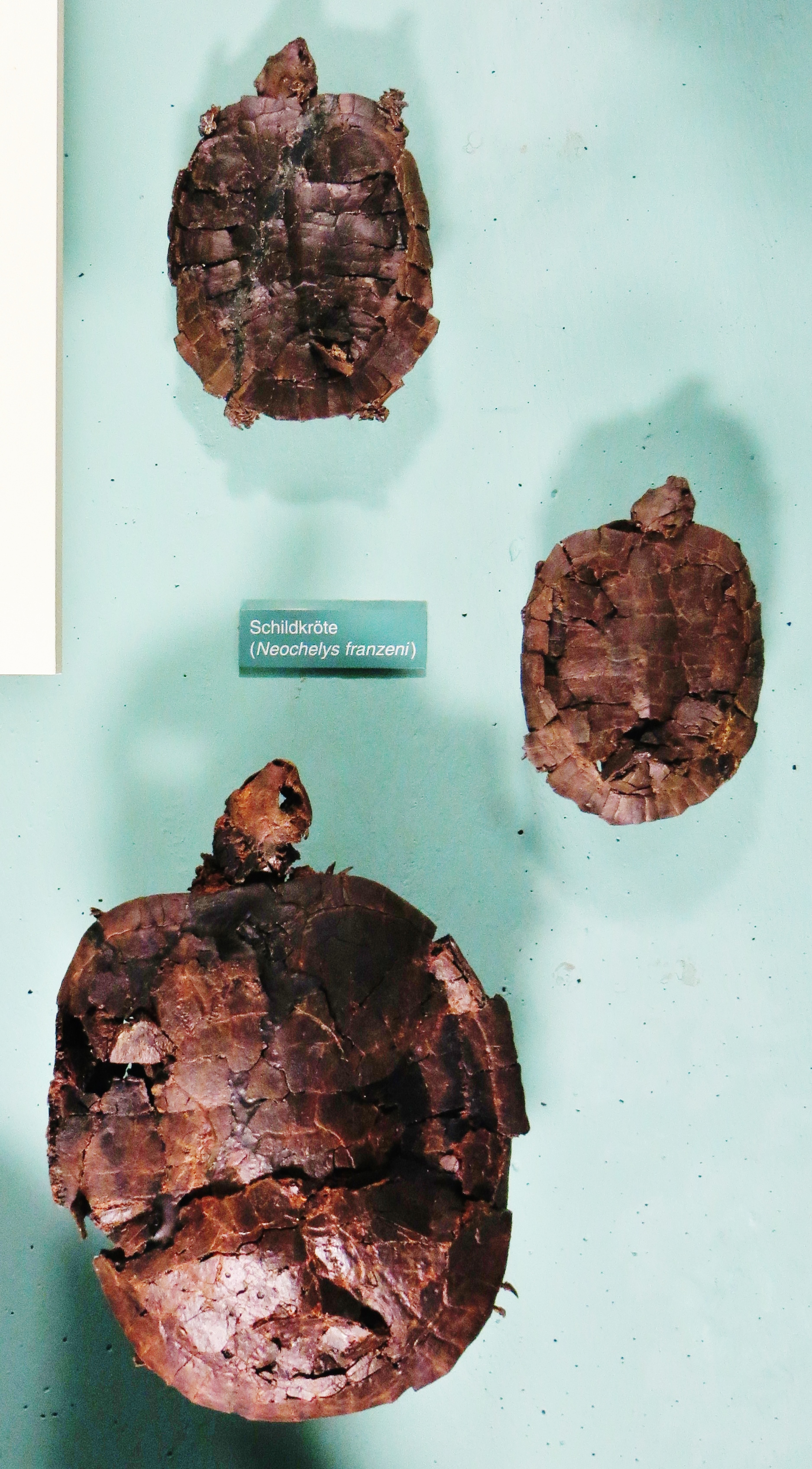
Well-preserved specimens of N. franzeni are known from the Messel Formation

Indeterminate remains are known from the latest Eocene (Priabonian) of France and Spain; these have not been assigned to a specific species, but represent the youngest record of the genus. The species "N." fajumensis from the Oligocene of Egypt was briefly assigned to this genus, but is now thought to belong to its own genus, Shetwemys.

Morphological analyses suggest that Neochelys likely represents an ancient lineage of the Erymnochelyinae, sister to the clade composed of the South American Peltocephalus and the Malagasy Erymnochelys. The taxonomic relationships between the multiple Neochelys species remain largely unknown. It has been suggested that N. eocaenica, N. capellinii, and N. salmanticensis together form a species complex known as the "N. eocaenica complex", but this is uncertain.

== Palaeopathology ==
A Neochelys sp. specimen exhibiting pelvic asymmetry has been found in the Duero Basin. Potential causes, none of which can be ruled out, of this palaeopathology include metabolic bone disease, a developmental abnormality, or some sort of traumatic injury.

== Ecology ==
A pathological Neochelys shell is known from the middle Eocene of Spain, hosting abnormalities that were previously thought to be the result of a crocodile attack. However, more recent studies instead suggest that these may instead occurred from parasites or a bacterial/fungal infection.
