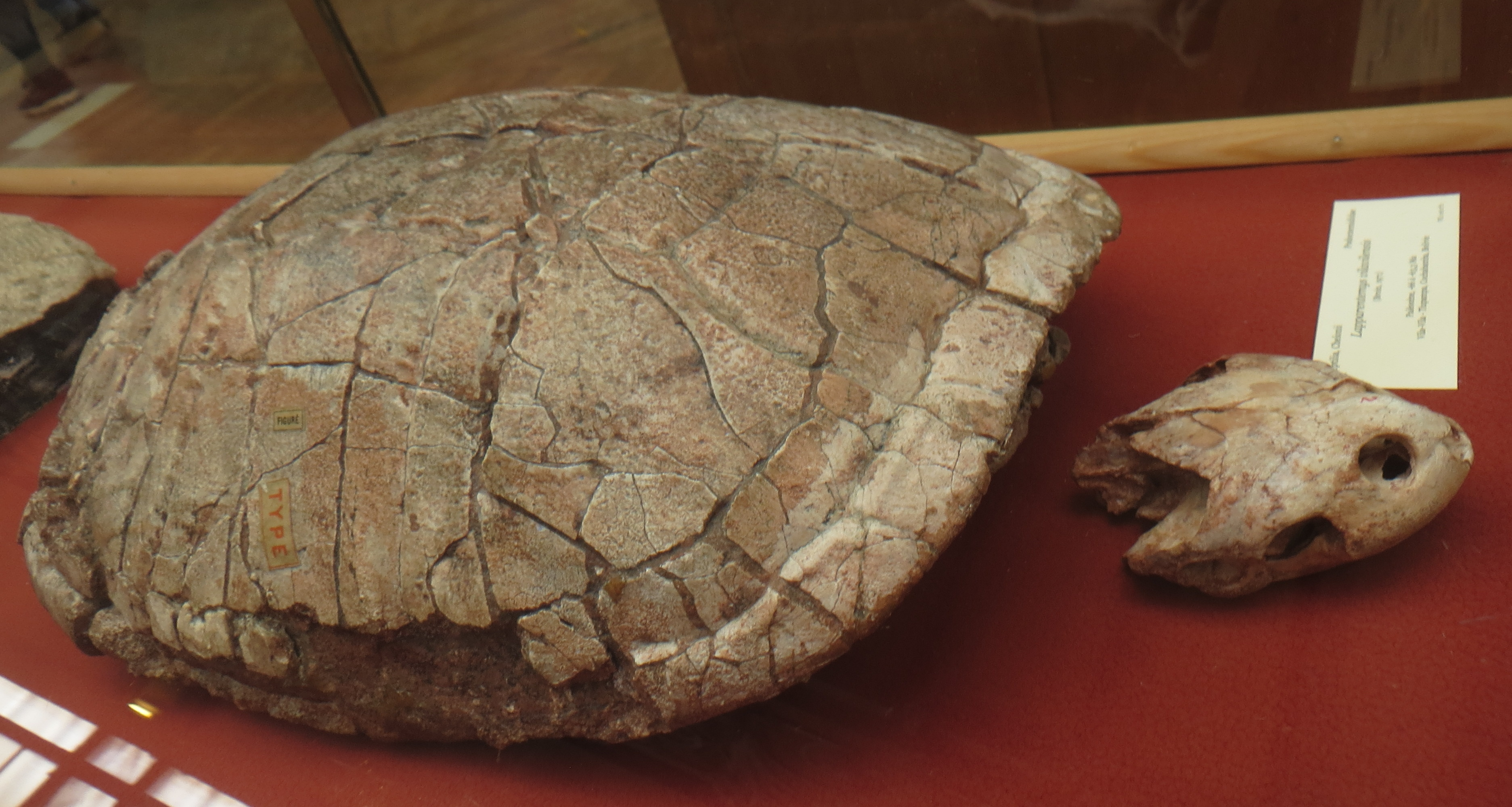
- Fossil

Scientific classification
- Domain: Eukaryota
- Kingdom: Animalia
- Phylum: Chordata
- Class: Reptilia
- Order: Testudines
- Suborder: Pleurodira
- Family: Podocnemididae
- Genus: †Lapparentemys; Gaffney et al., 2011
- Species: †L. vilavilensis

Binomial name
- †Lapparentemys vilavilensis (Broin, 1971)

= Lapparentemys =

Lapparentemys Temporal range: Danian (Tiupampan) ~66–62 Ma

Extinct genus of turtles

Lapparentemys is an extinct genus of podocnemidid turtles. Fossils of the genus have been found in the Tiupampan Santa Lucía Formation of Bolivia. The type species is L. vilavilensis.
