= Bairdemys =

Bairdemys Temporal range: Late Oligocene-Late Miocene ~24–7.3 Ma

Scientific classification
- Kingdom: Animalia
- Phylum: Chordata
- Class: Reptilia
- Order: Testudines
- Suborder: Pleurodira
- Family: Podocnemididae
- Subtribe: †Stereogenyina
- Infratribe: †Bairdemydita; Gaffney et al. 2011
- Genus: †Bairdemys; Gaffney & Wood 2002

Type species
- †Bairdemys hartsteini Gaffney & Wood 2002

Species
- †Bairdemys hartsteini Gaffney & Wood 2002; †Bairdemys healeyorum Weems & Knight 2013; †Bairdemys sanchezi Gaffney et al. 2008; †Bairdemys thalassica Ferreira et al. 2015; †Bairdemys venezuelensis Wood & Díaz 1971; †Bairdemys winklerae Gaffney et al. 2008

Extinct genus of turtles

Bairdemys is an extinct genus of side-necked turtles in the family Podocnemididae. The genus existed from the Late Oligocene to Late Miocene and its fossils have been found in South Carolina, Puerto Rico, Panama and Venezuela. The genus was described in 2002 by Gaffney & Wood and the type species is B. hartsteini.

== Taxonomy ==
Bairdemys belonged to the Stereogenyini, a tribe of the subfamily Erymnochelyinae that had adapted to coastal marine habitats and was successful from the late Oligocene through much of the Neogene. This tribe was primarily diverse along the coastlines of the Tethys (and later Indian) ocean of Africa and Asia, with Bairdemys being the only genus inhabiting the coastlines of the western Atlantic Ocean along the Americas. The separation between the Afro-Asian Stereogenyita and the American Bairdemydita (containing only Bairdemys) appears to have occurred at the start of the Late Oligocene.

== Description ==
The first species in the genus described was B. venezuelensis as Podocnemis venezuelensis by Wood and Díaz de Gamero in 1971.

=== Species ===
- †B. hartsteini Gaffney & Wood 2002
- †B. healeyorum Weems & Knight 2013
- †B. sanchezi Gaffney et al. 2008
- †B. thalassica Ferreira et al. 2015
- †B. venezuelensis Wood & Díaz 1971
- †B. winklerae Gaffney et al. 2008

== Phylogeny ==
Bairdemys was placed phylogenetically by Ferreira et al. in 2015.

== Distribution ==
Bairdemys fossil locations
Urumaco Formation
Alajuela Formation
Capadare & Castillo Formations
Cibao Formation
Chandler Bridge Formation

Fossils of Bairdemys have been found in:

Late Oligocene

- Chandler Bridge Formation, Arikareean, South Carolina

Early-Mid Miocene

- Cibao Formation, Hemingfordian, Puerto Rico
- El Miedo Cave, Capadare and Castillo Formations, Laventan, Venezuela

Late Miocene

- Alajuela Formation, earliest Clarendonian, Panama
- Urumaco Formation, Chasicoan, Venezuela

== See also ==
- Carbonemys
- Stupendemys
