= Qataniaria =

Qataniaria Temporal range: Albian

Scientific classification
- Kingdom: Plantae
- Clade: Tracheophytes
- Clade: Gymnospermae
- Division: Gnetophyta (?)
- Genus: †Qataniaria; Krassilov (2011)
- Species: †Q. noae

Binomial name
- †Qataniaria noae Krassilov (2011)

Extinct genus of plants

Qataniaria is a fossil plant genus which existed in what is now Israel during the Albian period. It was described by Valentin Krassilov and Eckart Schrank in 2011. The type species is Qataniaria noae. It is considered to be a gymnosperm, possibly a gnetophyte.
