= Brasiliguana =

Brasiliguana Temporal range: Upper Cretaceous, Turonian–Santonian

Scientific classification
- Domain: Eukaryota
- Kingdom: Animalia
- Phylum: Chordata
- Class: Reptilia
- Order: Squamata
- Suborder: Iguania
- Genus: †Brasiliguana; Nava & Martinelli, 2011

Species
- †B. prudentis Nava & Martinelli, 2011 (type)

Extinct genus of lizards

Brasiliguana is a genus of iguanian lizard which lived during the late Cretaceous period (Turonian to Santonian stage) in what is now Brazil. It is known from the holotype MN 7230-V, an isolated left maxilla with partially preserved teeth, which was found in the Upper Cretaceous Adamantina Formation, part of the Bauru Group of São Paulo State, southeast Brazil. Brasiliguana was named by William R. Nava and Agustín G. Martinelli in 2011 and the type species is Brasiliguana prudentis. The generic name refers to its provenance from the Late Cretaceous of Brazil and iguana, from the South American and Caribbean aboriginal language meaning "lizard". The specific name, prudentis, refers to Presidente Prudente Municipality, where the holotype was found.

Brasiliguana prudentis constitutes the second lizard species from the Late Cretaceous of Brazil based on cranial material, the third lizard record from the Bauru Group and the sixth from the Cretaceous of Brazil as a whole.
