= Ragechelus =

Ragechelus Temporal range: Maastrichtian

Scientific classification
- Kingdom: Animalia
- Phylum: Chordata
- Class: Reptilia
- Order: Testudines
- Suborder: Pleurodira
- Family: Podocnemididae
- Genus: †Ragechelus; De Lapparent de Broin et al., 2020

Extinct genus of turtles

Ragechelus is an extinct genus of erymnochelyine turtle that lived in Niger during the Maastrichtian stage. It is a monotypic genus known from a single species, R. sahelica.
