= Albertwoodemys =

Scientific classification
- Domain: Eukaryota
- Kingdom: Animalia
- Phylum: Chordata
- Class: Reptilia
- Order: Testudines
- Suborder: Pleurodira
- Family: Podocnemididae
- Genus: †Albertwoodemys; Gaffney, Meylan, Wood, Simons and Campos, 2011

Extinct genus of turtles

Albertwoodemys is an extinct genus of podocnemidid turtle. From the Early Oligocene in the Jebel Qatrani Formation of Egypt.
