= Castillo Formation, Venezuela =

Geologic formation in Venezuela

Castillo Formation
- Stratigraphic range: Burdigalian (Colhuehuapian-Santacrucian); ~19.2–17 Ma
- Type: Geological formation
- Unit of: Falcón Basin
- Underlies: Capadare Formation
- Overlies: Matatere, Misoa, El Paují and Jarillal Formations
- Thickness: 367 m (1,204 ft)

Lithology
- Primary: Argillaceous marl
- Other: Hardground, gypsum

Location
- Coordinates: 10°33′50″N 69°43′42″W
- Approximate paleocoordinates: 9.6°N 66.7°W
- Region: Falcón, Lara
- Country: Venezuela
- Extent: From La Mesa to Siquisique

Type section
- Named by: Wheeler
- Year defined: 1960
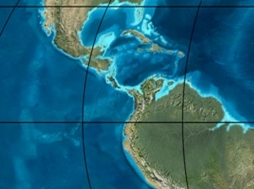
- Paleogeography of Northern South America, 20 Ma by Ron Blakey

Type locality of the Castillo Formation in Venezuela

The Castillo Formation is an Early Miocene (Burdigalian, Colhuehuapian to Santacrucian in the SALMA classification) geologic formation in the Falcón Basin of Venezuela. The formation unconformably overlies the Matatere, Misoa, El Paují and Jarillal Formations. The Castillo Formation is overlain by Quaternary alluvium and in places by the Capadare Formation. The formation, deposited in a calm near-shore lagoonal brackish environment, with possibly fluvial influence, has provided a rich assemblage of fossil crocodylians, turtles, giant sloths and various types of fish.

== Description ==
The Castillo Formation crops out cover a wide semicircular area that extends through the northwestern Venezuelan states of Falcón and Lara. During Oligocene to Miocene times, the formation formed the northwest to southeast edge of the Falcón Basin. The formation, with a minimum thickness of 367 metres (1,204 ft), has formerly been regarded as Late Oligocene in age (Wheeler, 1960), but more recent workers, regard it to be Early Miocene. The Castillo Formation at Cerro La Cruz comprises 87 metres (285 ft) of clayey marls, interbedded with numerous thin (less than 1 metre (3.3 ft)) hardground units. The strata are underlain and overlain by sandstones, and the upper 15 metres (49 ft) are gypsiferous.

The formation was deposited in a calm near-shore marine to brackish lagoonal environment with possibly fluvial influence. Elements of the fauna are consistent with the hypothesis that a tributary and/or delta of the Orinoco existed in this area of northwestern Venezuela during Early Miocene times. Other authors did not find convincing results to support this hypothesis.

== Fossil content ==
In the formation, apart from corals, fossils of the giant sloth Baraguatherium takumara, the turtle Chelus colombiana, the crocodylians Siquisiquesuchus venezuelensis, Purussaurus, Caiman, Gryposuchus, and indeterminate other crocodylians, and the pelican-like Pelagornis sp. have been found. The pelican-like fossil is the oldest of South America.

Other fossils reported from the formation are:

- silky shark (Carcharhinus falciformis)
- wahoo (Acanthocybium sp.)
- barracuda (Sphyraena sp.)
- Carcharhinus cf. obscurus
- Carcharhinus cf. perezi
- Hemipristis serra
- aff. Prosqualodon australis
- Bairdemys sp.
- Rhinoptera sp.
- Scirrotherium sp.
- Arecaceae indet.
- Astrapotheriidae indet.
- Iniidae indet.
- Litopterna indet.
- Mylodontidae indet.
- Platanistoidea indet.
- Squalidae indet.
- Tardigrada indet.
- Trionychoidea indet.

SALMA	Group	Fossils	Notes
Deseadan	Corals	Acropora saludensis, Alveopora tampae, Agathiphyllia antiguensis, A. tenuis, Antiguastrea cellulosa, Astrocoenia portoicensis, Colpophyllia willoughbiensis, Diploastrea crassolamellata, Goniastrea canalis, Montastrea canalis, Montastrea cavernosa, Montastrea imperatoris, Pocillopora arnoldi, Porites baracoaensis, Porites portoricensis, Porites trinitatis, Porites waylandi, Siderastrea conferta, Stephanocoenia duncani, Stylophora affinis, S. granulata	

== See also ==
- Urumaco
- Honda Group
- South American land mammal ages
