= Yuraramirim =

Yuraramirim Temporal range: Late Cretaceous

Scientific classification
- Kingdom: Animalia
- Phylum: Chordata
- Class: Reptilia
- Order: Testudines
- Suborder: Pleurodira
- Family: †Peiropemydidae
- Genus: †Yuraramirim; Ferreira et al., 2018

Type species
- Yuraramirim montealtensis Ferreira et al., 2018

Extinct genus of turtles

Yuraramirim is an extinct genus of turtle that lived in Brazil during the Late Cretaceous. It contains the species Y. montealtensis.
