= Mokelemys =

Mokelemys Temporal range: Early Pliocene

Scientific classification
- Kingdom: Animalia
- Phylum: Chordata
- Class: Reptilia
- Order: Testudines
- Suborder: Pleurodira
- Family: Podocnemididae
- Genus: †Mokelemys
- Species: †M. mbembe

Binomial name
- †Mokelemys mbembe Pérez-García, 2022

Extinct genus of turtle

Mokelemys is an extinct genus of erymnochelyin turtle that lived in the Democratic Republic of the Congo during the Zanclean stage of the Pliocene epoch.

== Etymology ==
Mokelemys mbembe is named after the cryptid mokele-mbembe.
