= Brontochelys =

Brontochelys Temporal range: Lower Miocene

Scientific classification
- Kingdom: Animalia
- Phylum: Chordata
- Class: Reptilia
- Order: Testudines
- Suborder: Pleurodira
- Family: Podocnemididae
- Genus: †Brontochelys; Gaffney, Meylan, Wood, Simons & Campos, 2011
- Species: †B. gaffneyi

Binomial name
- †Brontochelys gaffneyi Wood, 1970

Synonyms
- Shweboemys gaffneyi Wood, 1970

Extinct genus of turtles

Brontochelys is an extinct genus of podocnemidid (turtle) from the Miocene of Pakistan. The only species known, B. gaffneyi was classified before in the genus Shweboemys, which is known from the Pliocene of Burma. Brontochelys is represented only by its type specimen BMNH R.8570, a nearly complete skull, which exact locality is unknown but probably comes from the Lower Miocene sediments in the Bugti Hills, in Baluchistan, Pakistan. This skull is different from its relatives like Shweboemys, Lemurchelys and Stereogenys by its large, forward-faced orbits, a large frontal bone that composes most of the dorsal orbit margin and a palatal curved. The name of Brontochelys is formed by the Greek words bronte, "thunder" and chelys, "turtle", in reference to the large size of the skull.
