= Santa Lucía Formation =

Geological formation in Bolivia

- Stratigraphic range: Tiupampan 65–64.866 Ma
- Type: Geological formation
- Unit of: Potosí Basin
- Underlies: Cayara Formation
- Overlies: El Molino Formation
- Thickness: 100 m (330 ft)

Lithology
- Primary: mudstone, sandstone
- Other: tuff, gypsum, siltstone

Location
- Coordinates: 18°00′46.0″S 65°24′23.4″W
- Region: Cochabamba
- Country: Bolivia

Type section
- Location: Tiupampa, Mizque
- Coordinates: 18°00′46.0″S 65°24′23.4″W
- Approximate paleocoordinates: 20.7°S 52.5°W
- Santa Lucía Formation (Bolivia)

The Santa Lucía Formation is a geologic formation in Bolivia. It is part of the Potosí Basin and preserved fossils dating back to the earliest Paleogene. The formation is classified within three sections with the middle section being where the fossils are described from. The dating of the formation, mainly the vertebrate beds, has been disputed with current estimates placing the deposits at 65 mya. All deposits within the formation are representative of inland, freshwater ecosystems with most of the fossil coming from terrestrial mammals and reptiles. The climate was most likely similar to the modern climate in the area, being tropical with a wet and dry season. The formation overlies the El Molino Formation and underlies the Cayara Formation.

== Geology ==
The Santa Lucía Formation is located in southern Bolivia and is about 100 metres (330 ft) in thickness. The formation is divided into three sections with the lower being made up of red-brown mudstones with white to pink beds of tuff being found throughout; these beds are largely found in the most basal parts of the section. Orange-brown bioturbated siltstones can also be found at the basin margin within the Tiupampan strata. The middle section also is made up of mudstone though intercalated with turbidites and slumped blocks. Around the edges of the basin, red-brown mudstones along with conglomerate sandstones can be found with these sandstones being where most vertebrate specimens are found. In one area, in the area of Potosí, the lower part of the section is made up of sandy siltstones and mudstones though is largely made up of intercalations of gypsum beds. Between the lower and middle sections of the formation, the trend of an increase coarseness can be seen along with a thickening-upwards succession. The upper section of the Santa Lucía Formation, similar to the lower section, is made up of red-brown mudstones though the layers found in the upper section also can contain green bands. The top section of the formation unconformity underlies the overlying Cayara Formation due to erosion. In contrast to this, the formation slightly unconformity overlies the El Molino Formation with it being described as transitional.

=== Dating ===
The formation, as a whole, is poorly dated with ages generally ranging from the latest Cretaceous and earliest Cenozoic. However, the dating of the mammalian beds, like the Tiupampa locality, are much more well known. Originally, the mammal-bearing beds of the formation were dated to the late Cretaceous with later authors suggesting an early Paleocene date with the dating getting more specific since then. Marshall et al. had suggested that the beds dated to the late Paleocene, specifically Chron 26r. This suggestion was later refuted by Muizon in 1998 and more recent papers place the mammal-bearing beds in the earliest Paleocene. In 2008, Gelfo et al. compared the fauna to those in both North and South America with the Tiupampan stage being most comparable to the Puercan. In this paper, the authors also suggest that the fauna could be correlated with Chron 28r and, in turn, Pu3 which could suggest that the age of the fauna could range between 64 and 64.5 mya. Since this publication, the dating of Chron 28r has slightly changed at between 65 and 64.9 mya with more recent papers giving the fauna an age of 65 mya.

== Paleobiota ==
=== Actinopterygii ===
Actinopterygians of the Santa Lucía Formation
Genus	Species	Notes	Image
Andinichthys	A. bolivianensis		
Centropomidae gen. et sp. indet.			
Dajetella	D. sudumericana		
Gasreroclupea	G. branisai		
Hoffstetterichthys	H. pucai		
Hoplias	H. sp		
Incaichthys	I. suarezi		
Phareodusichthys	P. ravernei		
Rhineastes	R. sp		
Tiupampichthys	T. intermedius		
Yuskaichthys	Y. sp		

=== Amphibia ===
Amphibians of the Santa Lucía Formation
Genus	Species	Notes	Image
Estesius	E. boliviensis		
Gymnophiona indet.			

=== "Condylarthra" ===
"Condylarths" of the Santa Lucía Formation
Genus	Species	Notes	Image
Andinodus	A. boliviensis		
Molinodus	M. suarezi		
Pucanodus	P. gagnieri		
Simoclaenus	S. sylvaticus		
Tiuclaenus	T. cotasi		
Tiuclaenus	T. minutus		
Tiuclaenus	T. robustus		

=== Crocodylomorpha ===
Crocodylomorphs of the Santa Lucía Formation
Genus	Species	Notes	Image
Cynodontosuchus	C. rothi		
Dorbignysuchus	D. niatu		
Luciasuchus	L. lurusinqa		
Rodeosuchus	R. machukiru		
Zulmasuchus	Z. querejazus		

=== Dipnoi ===
Dipnoians of the Santa Lucía Formation
Genus	Species	Notes	Image
Ceratodus	C. sp		
Lepidosiren	L. cf. paradoxa		

=== Metatheria ===
Metatherians of the Santa Lucía Formation
Genus	Species	Notes	Image
Allqokirus	A. australis		
Andinodelphys	A. cochabambensis		
Epidolops	E. sp		
Incadelphys	I. antiquus		
Jaskhadelphys	J. minutus		
Khasia	K. cordillierensis		
Mayulestes	M. ferox		
Mizquedelphys	M. pilpinensis		
Peradectes	P. cf. austrinum		
Pucadelphys	P. andinus		
Roberthoffstetteria	R. nationalgeographica		
Szalinia	S. gracilis		
Tiulordia	T. floresi		

=== Pantodonta ===
Pantodonts of the Santa Lucía Formation
Genus	Species	Notes	Image
Alcidedorbignya	A. inopinata		

=== Squamata ===
Squamates of the Santa Lucía Formation
Genus	Species	Notes	Image
Aniliidae indet.			
Boidae indet.			
?Iguanidae indet.			
Kataria	K. anisodonta		
Madtsoiidae indet.			
Tropidophiidae indet.			

=== Testudines ===
Testudines of the Santa Lucía Formation
Genus	Species	Notes	Image
Lapparentemys	L. vilavilensis		

== Paleoenvironment ==
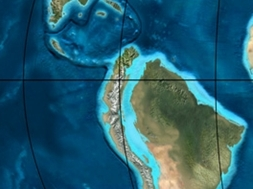
Paleogeography of Northern South America, 65 mya

The Santa Lucía Formation overall represents both alluvial and lacustrine environments with the lakes being controlled by the Khenayani-Turuchipa paleostructural corridor and the subsidence axis of the basin. The lower member is made up of lake deposits while the middle section is made up of both lake and meandering rivers on a floodplain. At the top of the middle member, a thick paleosol can be found that represents a reversal in the paleocurrent which represents a reactivation of the corridor. There is evidence of volcanic activity at the deposits near Potosí with these deposits representing non-permanent brine ponds surrounded by mudflats caused by a loss of water in a lake during dry season. Based on the sandstone portions of this section of the formation, rivers were most likely flowing from the northeast and east. Similar to the middle section, the upper section of the formation was deposited in both lakes and rivers on a floodplain. The climate of the mammal beds has been suggested to have been subtropical to tropical, similar to the modern climate in the region. Also similar to the modern climate, it most likely also had wet and dry seasons. Compared to its position today, the mammalian beds of the Santa Lucía Formation were further west.
