= Latentemys =

Latentemys Temporal range: 16.9–16 Ma

Scientific classification
- Domain: Eukaryota
- Kingdom: Animalia
- Phylum: Chordata
- Class: Reptilia
- Order: Testudines
- Suborder: Pleurodira
- Family: Podocnemididae
- Genus: †Latentemys; Gaffney et al. 2011

Type species
- †Latentemys plowdeni Gaffney et al. 2011

Extinct genus of turtles

Latentemys is an extinct genus of podocnemidid turtle. It is known from Miocene aged sediments of the Moghara Formation in Egypt.
