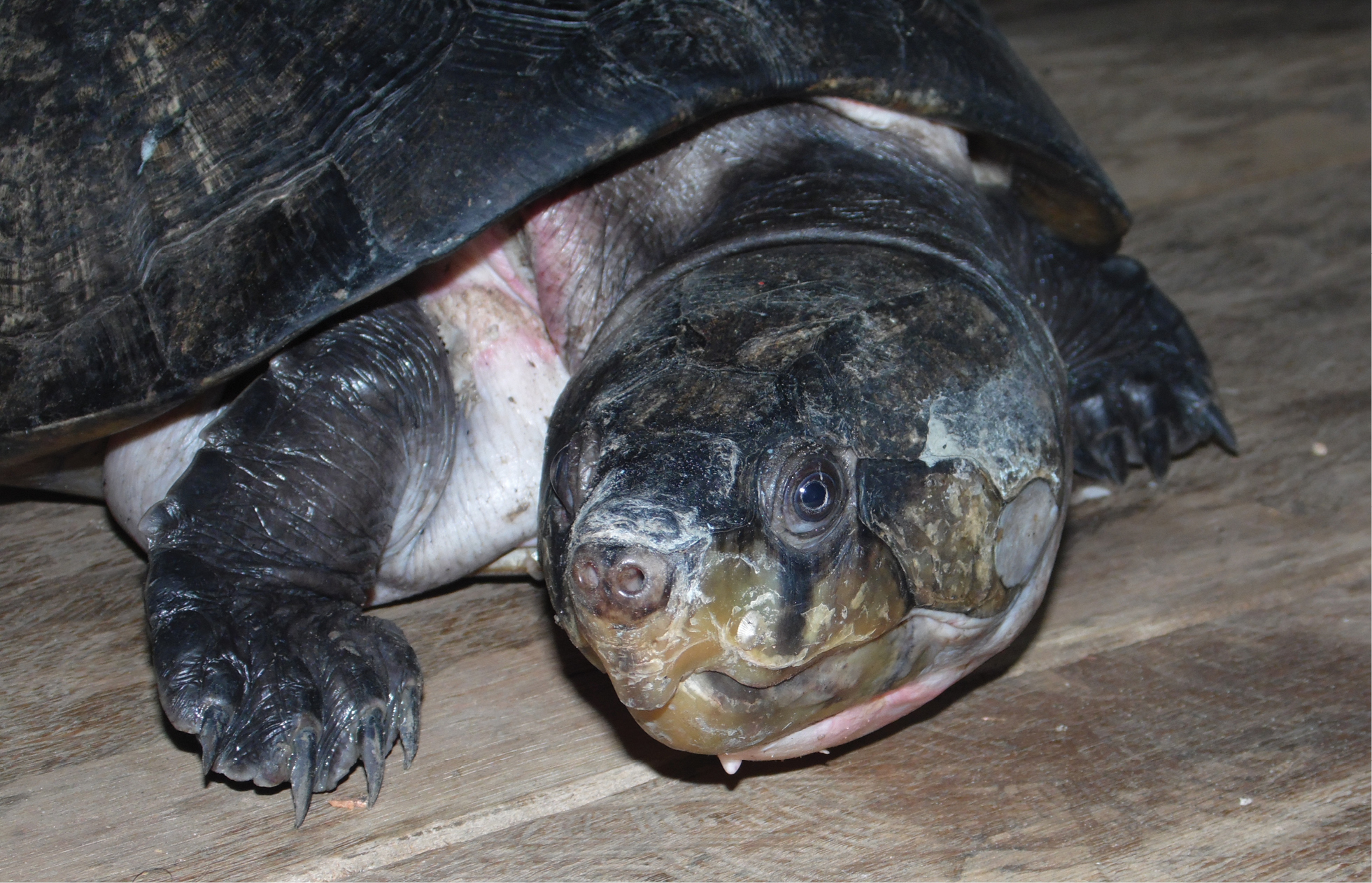

Conservation status
- Vulnerable (IUCN 2.3)
- CITES Appendix II

Scientific classification
- Kingdom: Animalia
- Phylum: Chordata
- Class: Reptilia
- Order: Testudines
- Suborder: Pleurodira
- Family: Podocnemididae
- Subfamily: Erymnochelyinae
- Genus: Peltocephalus; A.M.C. Duméril & Bibron, 1835
- Species: P. dumerilianus

Binomial name
- Peltocephalus dumerilianus (Schweigger, 1812)
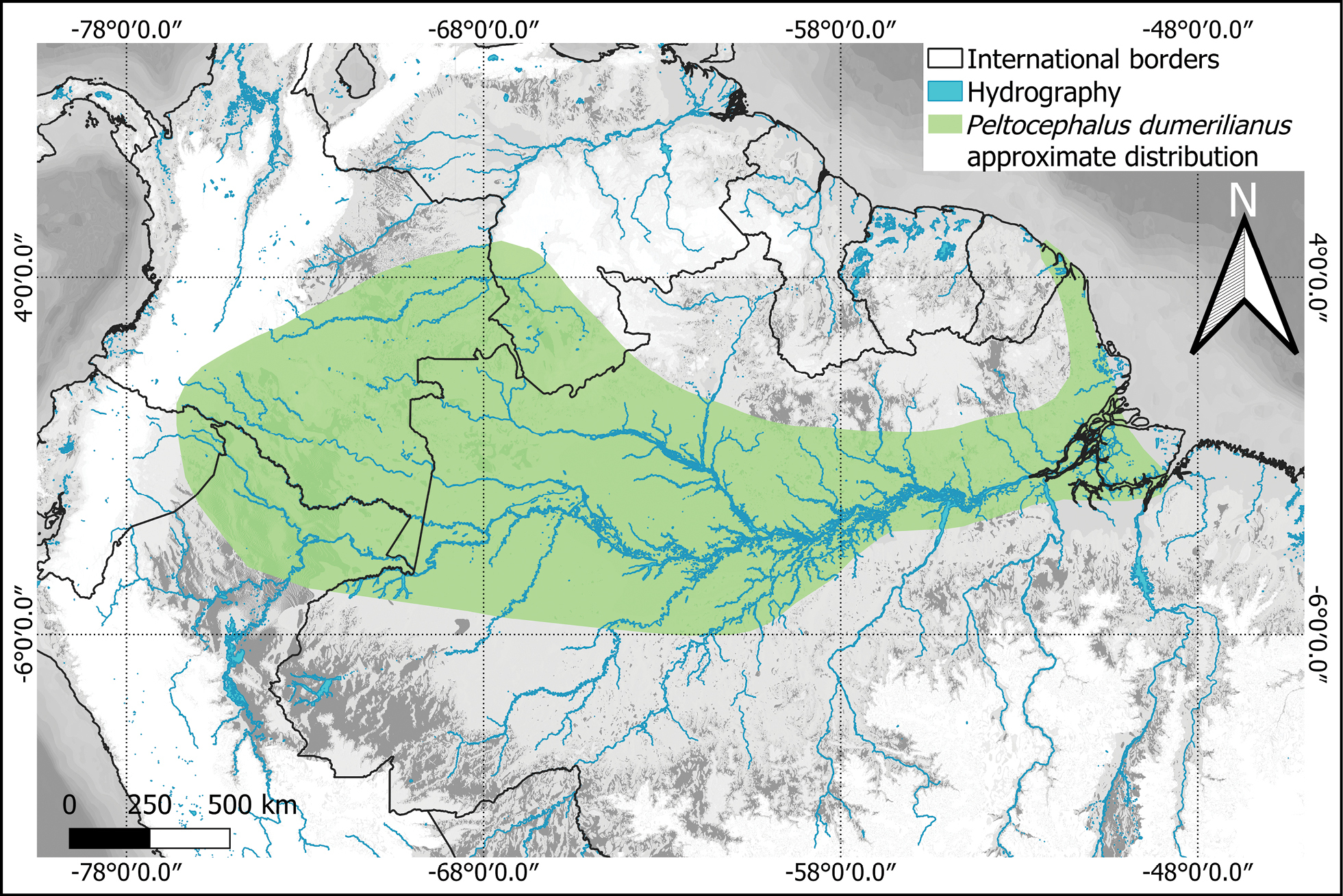
- Range

Synonyms
- List: Emys dumeriliana Schweigger, 1812; Emys macrocephala Spix, 1824; Emys tracaxa Spix, 1824; Chelys (Hydraspis) lata Gray in Griffith, 1831; Emys icterocephala Gray in Griffith, 1831; Chelys (Hydraspis) dumerilliana [sic] — Gray, 1831; Podocnemis dumeriliana — A.M.C. Duméril & Bibron, 1835; Peltocephalus tracaxa — A.M.C. Duméril & Bibron, 1835; Podocnemis tracaxa — Boulenger, 1889; Peltocephalus dumeriliana — Obst, 1985; Peltocephalus dumerilianus — Gorzula & Señaris, 1999

= Big-headed Amazon River turtle =

Species of turtle

The big-headed Amazon River turtle (Peltocephalus dumerilianus), also known as the big-headed sideneck, is a species of turtle in the family Podocnemididae.

== Taxonomy ==
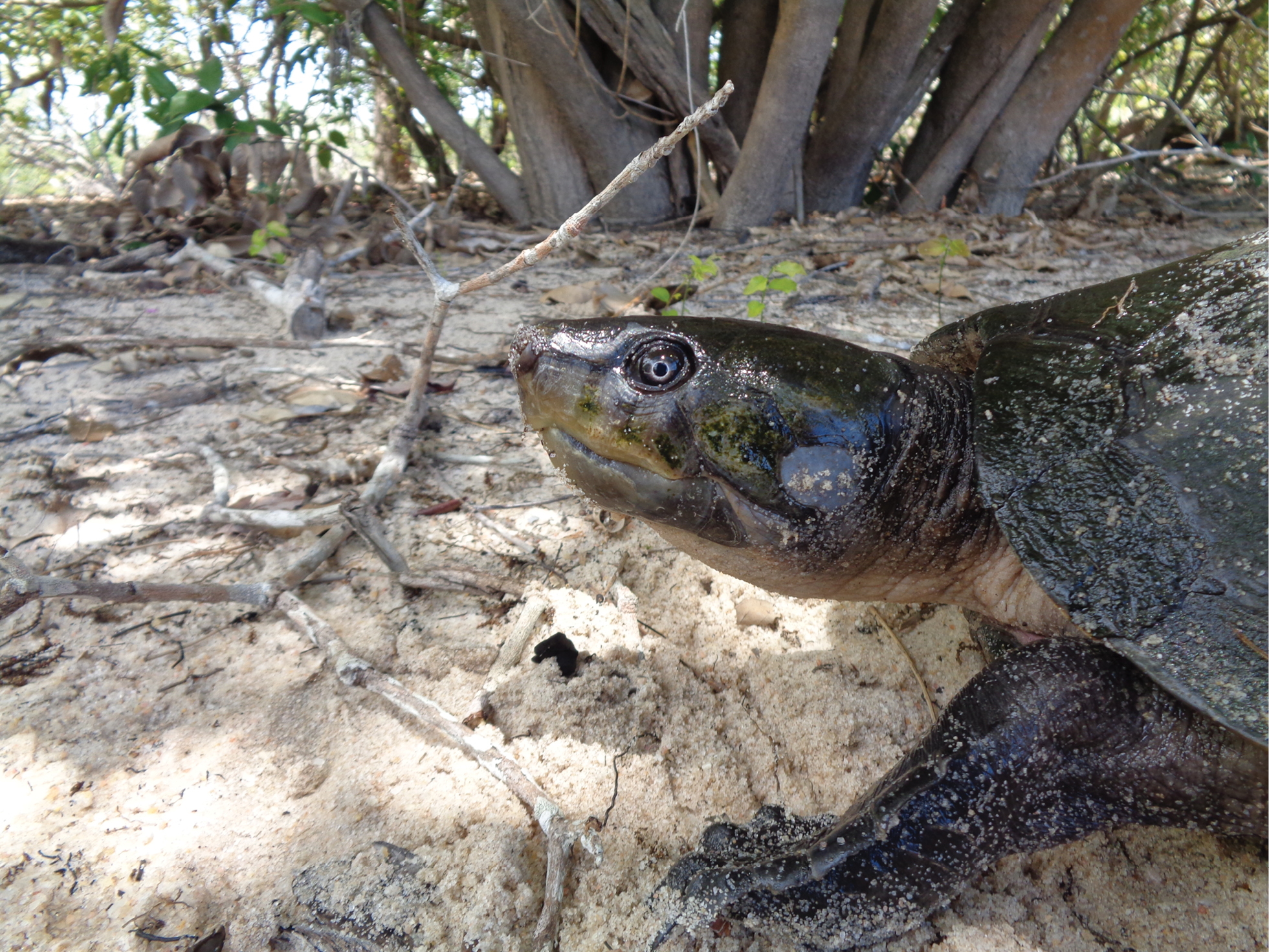
By a lake on the Tapajós River

An additional, much larger species of Peltocephalus is known, the extinct Peltocephalus maturin.

Peltocephalus is the most basal podocnemidid genus, splitting off in the Cretaceous around 86 million years ago.

=== Etymology ===
The specific name, dumerilianus, is in honor of French herpetologist André Marie Constant Duméril.

== Description ==
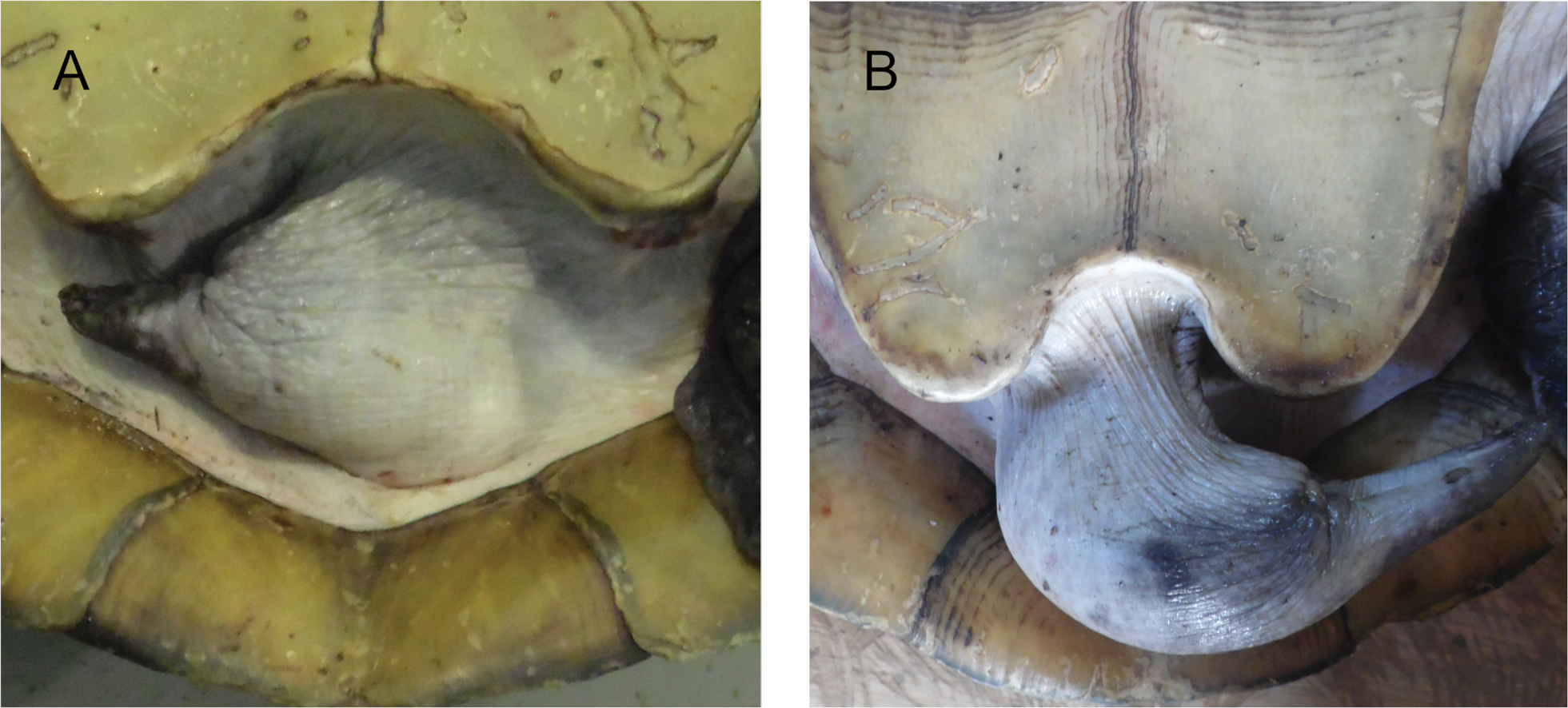
Tails of a female (A) and male (B)

The largest specimen recorded possessed a 50 cm-long (1.6 ft) carapace and weighing 15 kg (33 lb). Alfred Russel Wallace recorded finding a remarkably large Peltocephalus specimen on which eight people fed, with enough for leftovers for the next day. The exact size of this specimen is unknown.

Sexual dimorphism is present like in most turtles, with males being larger with wider heads and longer tails.

It is considered morphologically similar to another podocnemidid, the Madagascan big-headed turtle, which is similarly omnivorous unlike the herbivorous genus Podocnemis.

== Geographic range ==
P. dumerilianus is found in Brazil (Amazonas, Pará), Colombia, French Guiana, Venezuela, Ecuador, and possibly in Peru.

== Habitat ==
The preferred natural habitats of P. dumerilianus are rivers and freshwater swamps, preferring igapó and other blackwater river systems.

== Behaviour ==
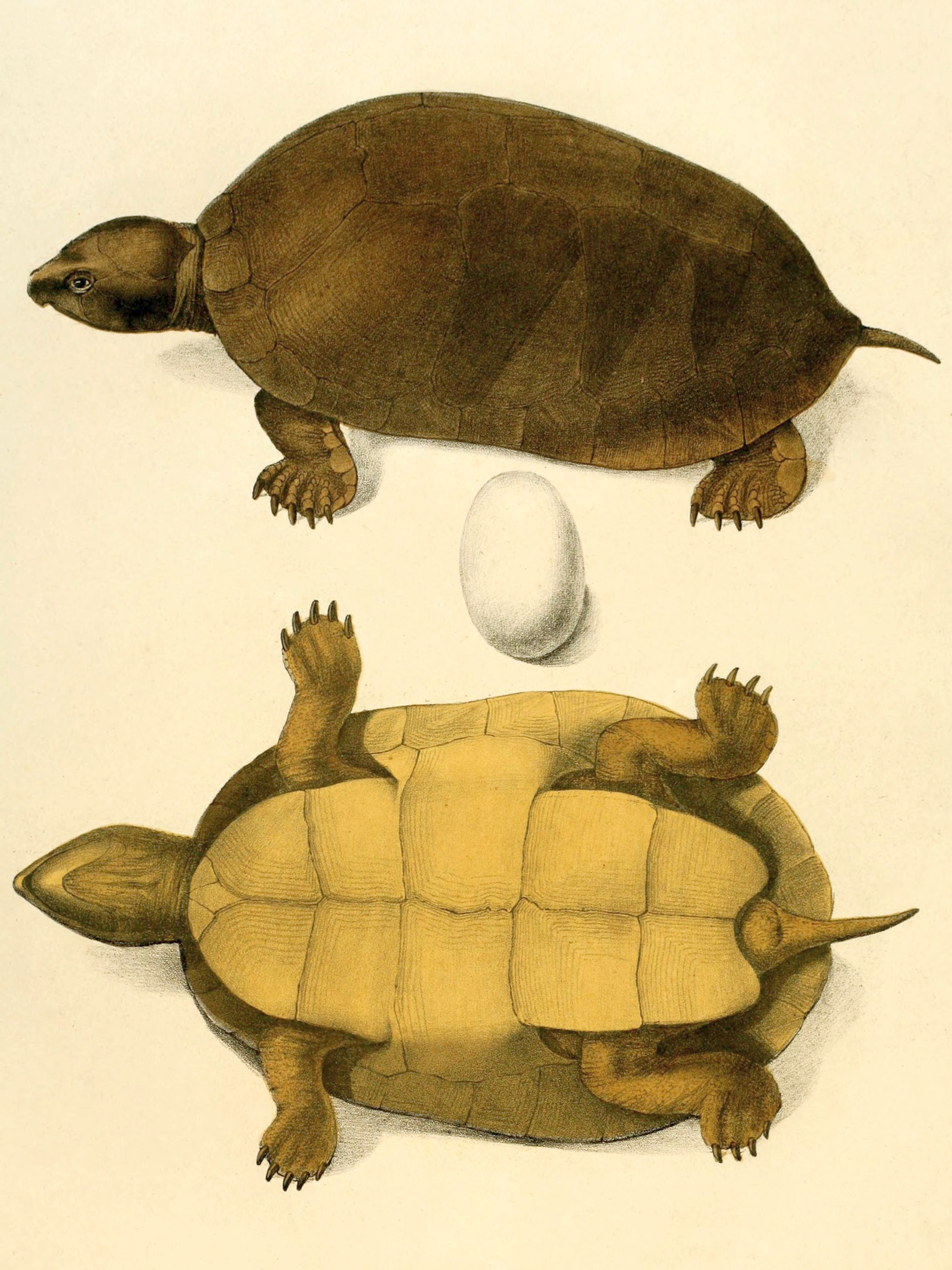
1824 illustration

While not territorial, its strong jaws have been recorded severely injuring a child's knee, and ribeirinhos often report them mutilating the fingers of adults. Even juveniles have bites powerful enough to tear chunks off a conspecific's plastron. Captive specimens can be highly aggressive towards other turtle species, even killing them.

Less agile swimmers than other podocnemidid turtles, they are generally thought to not disperse across long distances; one 19-year-old male was captured in the same stream where he was first tagged as a hatchling.

=== Diet ===
Like all extant podocnemidids, P. dumerilianus is a plant-based omnivore, though includes the largest proportion of animal matter in its diet among its family. Nevertheless, fruits and seeds can represent up to 85% of its diet. It has a preference for apple snails when available. As undigested seeds have been observed in the intestines, it may be an important seed disperser. It is an opportunistic predator, usually crawling around the bottom of water bodies searching for mollusks, fish, insects, and even scavenged carrion from other reptiles and mammals.

Adults have been observed sitting immobile underwater with their jaws open, possibly trying to catch prey with a sit-and-wait approach also seen in alligator snapping turtles.

=== Reproduction ===
Like all other turtles, P. dumerilianus is oviparous. Unlike other members of its group, which lay their eggs on sandy beaches, the big-headed Amazon River turtle prefers concealed nests.

== Conservation ==
Although listed as vulnerable by the IUCN, the assessment was made in 1996. This may no longer be reflective of the level of threat against this species, as habitat degradation has occurred through river contamination by mining activities and pesticides, deforestation, and the construction of hydroelectricity infrastructure. Additionally, illegal gold mining evicts over 1000 of the turtles per year (although this may be an underestimate), and they may then be sold on the market at a price of up to US$50 per turtle.

The species is hunted for consumption in its range. During Alfred Russel Wallace's expedition along the Negro and Orinoco Rivers, his team and he often fed on it. He records that while indigenous people in the upper Rio Negro often hunted the species, and penned them when food was scarce, they also told him that the species was getting rarer.
