= Lemurchelys =

Lemurchelys Temporal range: Early Miocene

Scientific classification
- Domain: Eukaryota
- Kingdom: Animalia
- Phylum: Chordata
- Class: Reptilia
- Order: Testudines
- Suborder: Pleurodira
- Family: Podocnemididae
- Genus: †Lemurchelys; Gaffney et al., 2011
- Species: †L. diasphax

Binomial name
- †Lemurchelys diasphax Gaffney et al., 2011

Extinct genus of turtles

Lemurchelys is an extinct genus of podocnemidid turtle, containing the single species Lemurchelys diasphax. It was described in 2011 from fossils found in the Moghara Formation of Egypt, dating to the Early Miocene.
