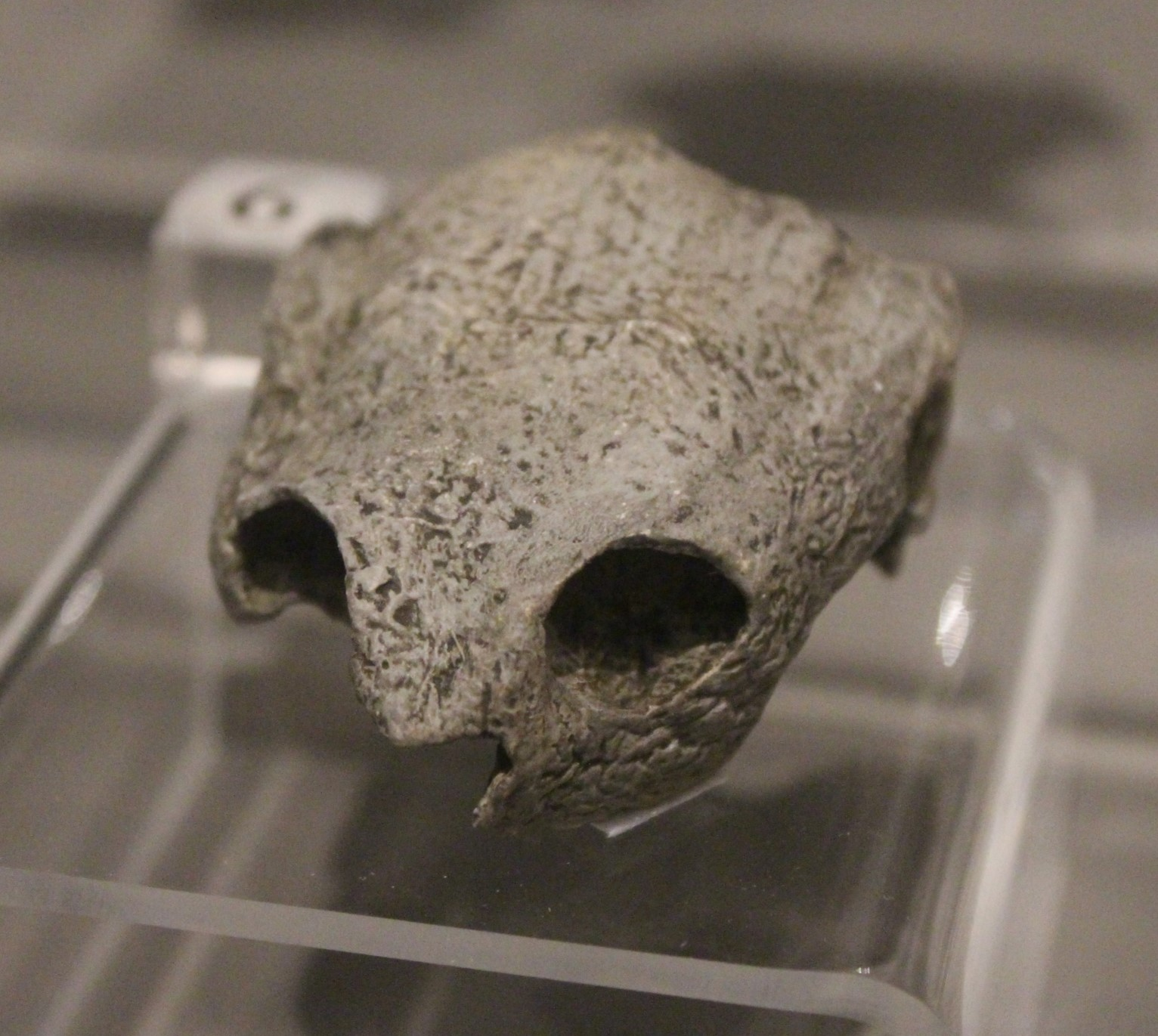
- Fossil skull, University of Michigan Museum of Natural History

Scientific classification
- Domain: Eukaryota
- Kingdom: Animalia
- Phylum: Chordata
- Class: Reptilia
- Order: Testudines
- Suborder: Pleurodira
- Family: Podocnemididae
- Genus: †Cordichelys

= Cordichelys =

Extinct genus of turtles

Cordichelys is an extinct genus of podocnemidid turtle. It was around during the Eocene. Fossils of this turtle have been discovered at Wadi El Hitan as of November 2020.
