= Cerrejonemys =

Cerrejonemys Temporal range: Mid-Late Paleocene (Peligran-Itaboraian) ~60–58 Ma

Scientific classification
- Domain: Eukaryota
- Kingdom: Animalia
- Phylum: Chordata
- Class: Reptilia
- Order: Testudines
- Suborder: Pleurodira
- Family: Podocnemididae
- Subfamily: Podocnemidinae
- Genus: †Cerrejonemys; Cadena et al., 2010

Species
- C. wayuunaiki Cadena et al., 2010 (type)

Extinct genus of turtles

Cerrejonemys wayuunaiki is an extinct podocnemid turtle which existed in Colombia during the Paleogene period; the Middle to Late Paleocene epoch.

== Etymology ==
Fossils of the genus have been found in the Cerrejón Formation of La Guajira, from which it takes its genus name; "turtle from Cerrejón". The species epithet refers to the Wayuu language, called "Wayuunaiki" in its own language, of the Wayuu people, inhabiting the La Guajira desert.
