= Moghara Formation =

Geologic formation in Egypt

- Stratigraphic range: Aquitanian-Burdigalian; ~21–17 Ma

The Moghara Formation is a geologic formation located in Egypt. It preserves numerous fossils of extinct vertebrates. It is dated to the Miocene epoch.

== Description ==
The Moghara Formation is composed of siliclastic sediments. Its age has been estimated 21 to 17 mya. Its thickness has been estimated at 400 meters in thickness. It was defined by Said et al in 1962 and the palaeonvironment of Moghra has been suggested to be a series of estuarine units stacked in a net transgressive stratigraphy.

== Paleobiota of the Moghara Formation ==
=== Mammalia ===
Mammals of The Moghara Formation
| Genus | Species | Material | Notes |
|---|---|---|---|
| Megistotherium | M.osteothlates | Skull | A gigantic hyaenodont. |
| Amphicyon | A.giganteus | Cranial material | A gigantic amphicyonid. |
| Mogharacyon | M.anubsi | Cranial material | An amphicyonid. |
| Prolibytherium | P.magnieri | Cranial material | A prolibytheriid. |
| Brachyodus | B.africanus | Cranial material | An anthracothere. |
| Aceratherium | A.sp | Teeth | A rhinoceratid. |
| Zygolophodon | Z.aegytipicus | Skull | A mammutid. |
| Archaeobelodon | A.sp. | Skull | An amebelodontid. |

=== Reptilia ===
Reptiles of the Moghara Formation
| Genus | Species | Material | Notes |
|---|---|---|---|
| Rimasuchus | R.lloydi | Skull | A large crocodylian. |
| Varanus | V.sp | Vertebrae | A monitor lizard. |
| Python (genus) | P.sp | Vertebrae | A python. |
