= Eugene S. Gaffney =

American paleontologist

Eugene S. Gaffney is an American paleontologist and leading authority on the morphology and evolutionary history of turtles.

== Biography ==
Gaffney graduated from Rutgers State University in 1965 and received his PhD in 1969 with a thesis on "The North American Baenoidea and the Cryptodire-Pleurodire Dichotomy" from Columbia University, where he also taught as an adjunct professor for most of his career. He was hired as Curator of Fossil Reptiles, Amphibians, and Birds in 1970 in the Department of Vertebrate Paleontology, American Museum of Natural History. Beginning at the rank of Assistant Curator in 1970, he was promoted to Associate Curator in 1973 and to Curator in 1980. He retired in 2007 as Curator Emeritus.He has authored over 100 publications on turtle systematics and phylogeny.

Dr. Gaffney pioneered the use of cladistics in turtle research. He has done fieldwork in Canada and the United States, central Europe, southern Africa, China, Argentina, Brazil, and especially Australia, where he has studied the evolution of the Meiolania, the giant horned turtle.

== Honors ==
The Gaffney Turtle Symposium on fossil turtles was held in his honor at the Royal Tyrrell Museum in Drumheller, Alberta, Canada, in 2009. The symposium resulted in a Publication containing a number of papers in fields associated with Gaffney as well as two biographies and a complete bibliography of Gaffney.

Several species of fossil turtles, including the protostegid sea turtle, Santanachelys gaffneyi, Gaffneylania auricularis, and the Macrobaenid Aurorachelys gaffneyi have also been named in his honor.

== Selected publications ==
- Brinkman, D.B., Holroyd, P.A., Gardner, J.D. (2012).(editors) "Morphology and Evolution of Turtles: Proceedings of the Gaffney Turtle Symposium 2009". Springer Dordrecht, 577 pp.
- Gaffney, E.S. (1972). The systematics of the North American family Baenidae (Reptilia, Cryptodira). Bulletin of the American Museum of Natural History, 147: 241–320.
- Gaffney, E. S. (1975). A phylogeny and classification of the higher categories of turtles. Bulletin of the American Museum of Natural History 155(5): 389–436. on-line
- Gaffney, E. S. (1979). The Jurassic turtles of North America. Bulletin of the American Museum of Natural History 162 (3): 91–136.
- Gaffney, E. S. (1979). An introduction to the logic of phylogeny reconstruction. In J. Cracraft and N. Eldredge (editors), Phylogenetic analysis and paleontology: 79–111. New York: Columbia University Press.
- Gaffney, E. S. (1980). Phylogenetic relationships of the major groups of amniotes. In A. L. Panchen (editor), The terrestrial environment and the origin of land vertebrates: 593–610. London, New York: Academic Press.
- Gaffney, E. S., & P. A. Meylan. (1988). A phylogeny of turtles. In M. J. Benton, (editor), The phylogeny and classification of tetrapods: 157–219. Oxford: Clarendon Press.
- Gaffney, E. S. (1990). Dinosaurs A Golden Guide. Western Publishing Company, Inc. 160 pp.
- Norell, M. A., Gaffney, E. S., & Dingus, L. (1995). Discovering Dinosaurs in the American Museum of Natural History. Alfred A. Knopf, 204 pp.
- Gaffney, E. S. (1996) The postcranial morphology of Meiolania platyceps and a review of the Meiolaniidae. Bulletin of the American Museum of Natural History; no. 229 on-line
- Gaffney, E. S., Tong, H., & Meylan, P. A. (2006) Evolution of the side-necked turtles : the families Bothremydidae, Euraxemydidae, and Araripemydidae. Bulletin of the American Museum of Natural History, no. 300 on-line
- Gaffney, Eugene S.; Meylan, Peter A.; Wood, Roger C.; Simons, Elwyn; De Almeida Campos, Diogenes (2011), "Evolution of the side-necked turtles: the family Podocnemididae" (PDF), AMNH Bulletin, 350: 1–237
