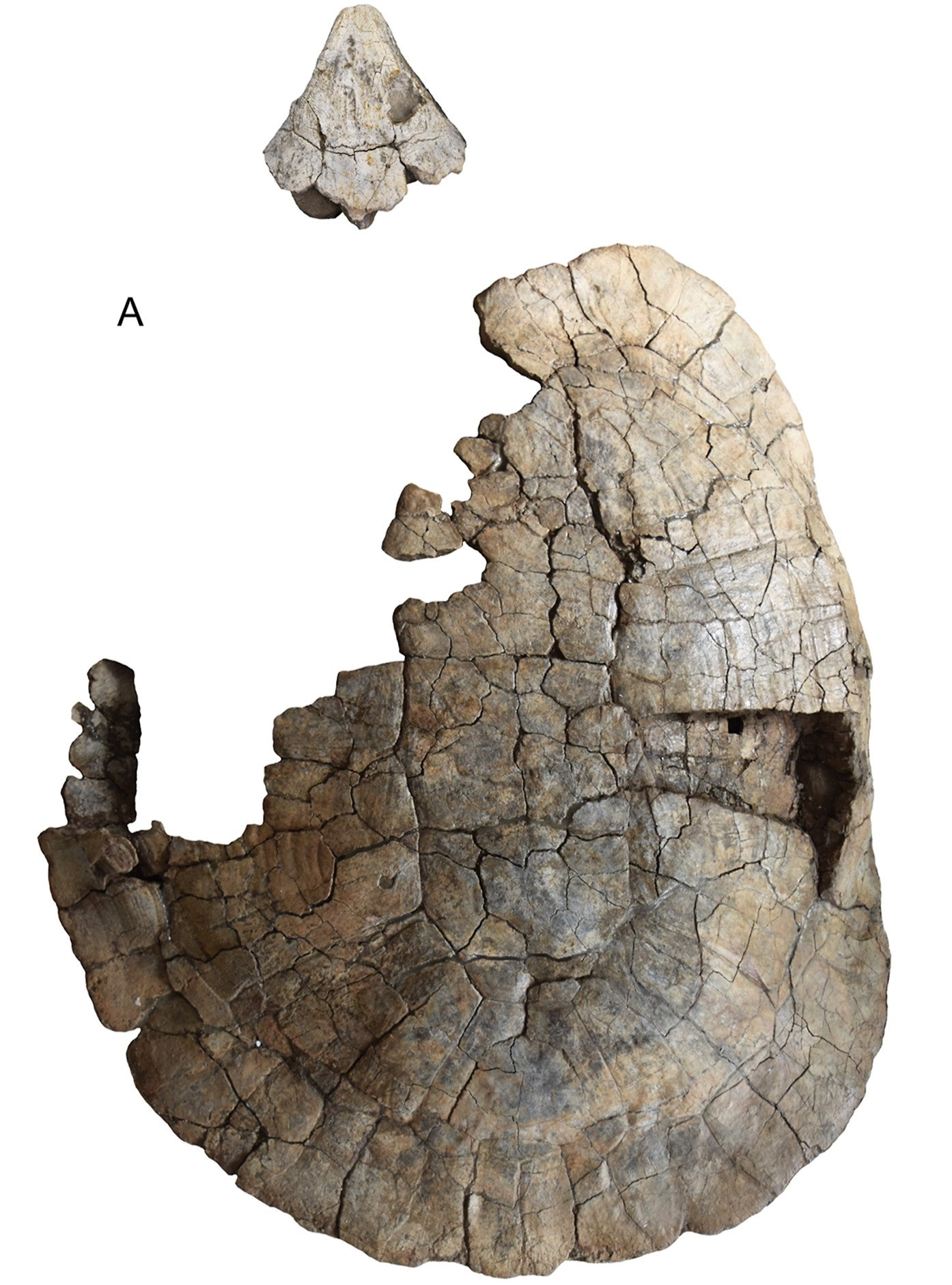
- A young adult Stupendemys specimen

Scientific classification
- Kingdom: Animalia
- Phylum: Chordata
- Class: Reptilia
- Order: Testudines
- Suborder: Pleurodira
- Family: Podocnemididae
- Genus: †Stupendemys; Wood, 1976

Species
- †S. geographica Wood, 1976

Synonyms
- †S. souzai Bocquentin & Melo, 2006

= Stupendemys =

Stupendemys Temporal range: Langhian - Messinian 9.0–7.246 Ma

Extinct genus of turtles

Stupendemys is an extinct genus of freshwater side-necked turtle, belonging to the family Podocnemididae. It is the largest freshwater turtle known to have existed, with a carapace over 2 meters long. Its fossils have been found in northern South America, in rocks dating from the Middle Miocene to the very start of the Pliocene, about 13 to 5 million years ago. Male specimens are known to have possessed bony horns growing from the front edges of the shell and the discovery of the fossil of a young adult shows that the carapace of these turtles flattens with age. A fossil skull described in 2021 indicates that Stupendemys was a generalist feeder.

== History and naming ==
Stupendemys was first named in 1976 by Roger C. Wood based on specimen MCNC-244, the medial portion of a large sized carapace with associated left femur, scapulacoracoid and a cervical vertebra. Wood also described several other specimens he referred to Stupendemys, which includes MCZ(P)-4376. This specimen preserves much of the carapace alongside a fragmented plastron and various other bones. The fossils were unearthed by a paleontological excavation of the Harvard University in Venezuela in 1972. In 2006 a second species, Stupendemys souzai was described by Bocquentin and Melo based on material from the Solimões Formation in Acre State in Brazil, also home to the giant Caninemys. In February 2020, Cadena and colleagues published a paper describing material discovered during the routine excavations in the Urumaco Formation, which have been ongoing since 1994. The material includes a relatively complete carapace that set a new maximum size for the genus and was designated as the allotype, meaning the specimen is of the opposite sex of the holotype. Venezuela also yielded fossils of a lower jaw, which has been used to lump Caninemys into Stupendemys in the 2020 study. The authors likewise consider S. souzai to be synonymous with S. geographica. However, more fossils were discovered in the Colombian Tatacoa Desert and formally described by Cadena and colleagues in 2021, including the first definitive skull remains as well as the first remains of a juvenile or early adult specimen (carapace length under 1 meter). The La Victoria Formation also yielded the remains of an adult female as well as more fossils of Caninemys. With definitive skull remains of Stupendemys known in association with a carapace and new fossils of Caninemys, the referral of Caninemys' skull to Stupendemys was contested and the former was re-established as a valid genus.

The name Stupendemys is a combination of "stupendous", meaning extremely impressive, and the Latin word "emys" for freshwater turtle. The species name meanwhile honors the National Geographic Society. However, the name Stupendemys geographicus, as coined by Wood, is grammatically incorrect, as Stupendemys constitutes a feminine generic name. The name was eventually corrected to Stupendemys geographica in 2021 in accordance with the International Code of Zoological Nomenclature (ICZN).

== Description ==
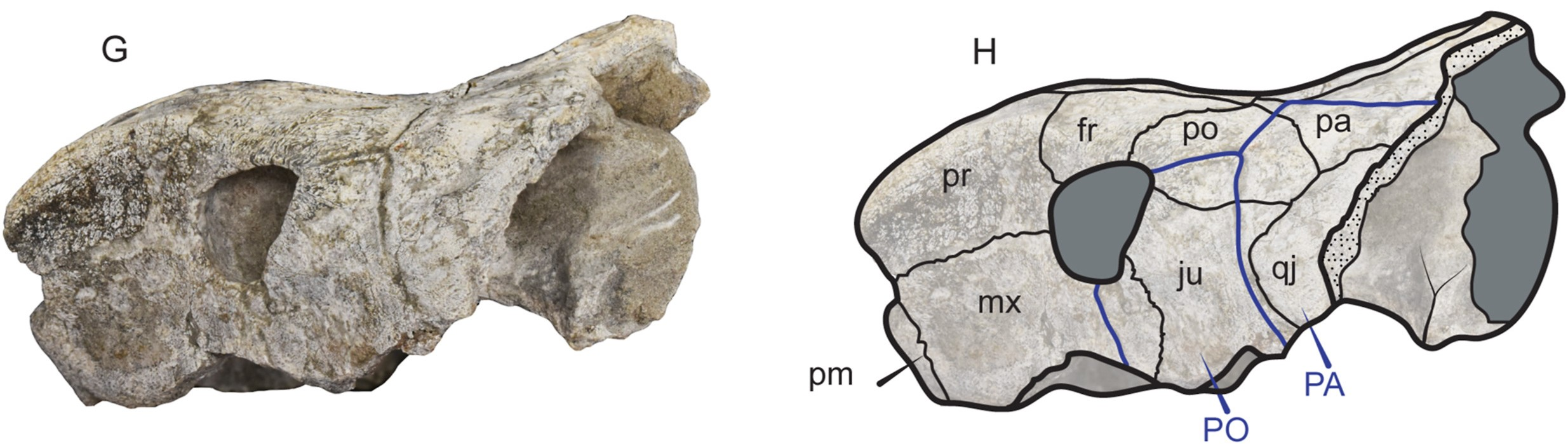
Stupendemys skull

The skull of Stupendemys is roughly triangular in top view and the edges of the jaws converge at the front of the snout in a straight edge. The skull is dorsally extremely inflated by the prefrontals that make up a large area of the front region of the skull, forming a vertical wall above the bony nostril. Following the prefrontals and orbits the skull slopes down drastically before ascending again through the parietals. The orbits are relatively small and oriented to the sides. When viewed from below the premaxillae bear a deep concavity at their center. In this view the premaxillae form most of the anteromedial edge of the skull, meeting each other towards the middle of the skull and narrowing just before the deep concavity. In front view, the premaxillae form the bottom margin of the bony nostrils, tapering as they move down.

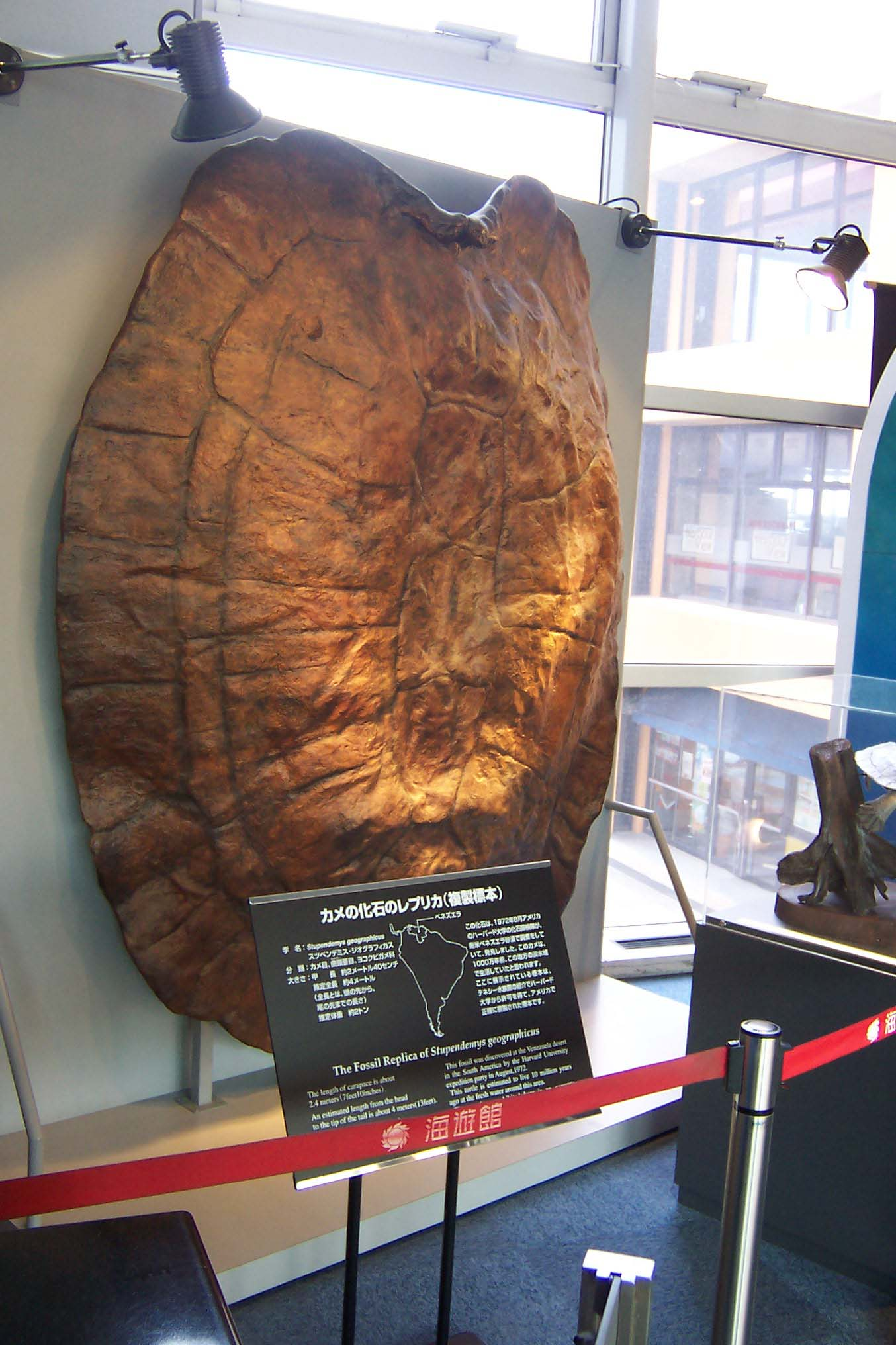
Replica of MCZ(P)-4376 in Osaka

The carapace of adult Stupendemys can reach a straight midline length of greater than 2 meters with a low-arched profile. The nodular contours on the surface are irregular and the frontal margin of the shell is characterized by a deep notch flanked by large horns in male specimens. These horns are deeply grooved, suggesting that they were covered by a keratinous sheath. In addition to these horns, the front margin of the nuchal-peripheral bones is notably thickened and upturned. The surface is smooth to striated or lightly pitted. The margins of the posterior peripheral bones are moderately scalloped. The costal scutes of the carapace are relatively thin. In overall shape, the carapace of Stupendemys is longer than it is wide.

=== Size ===
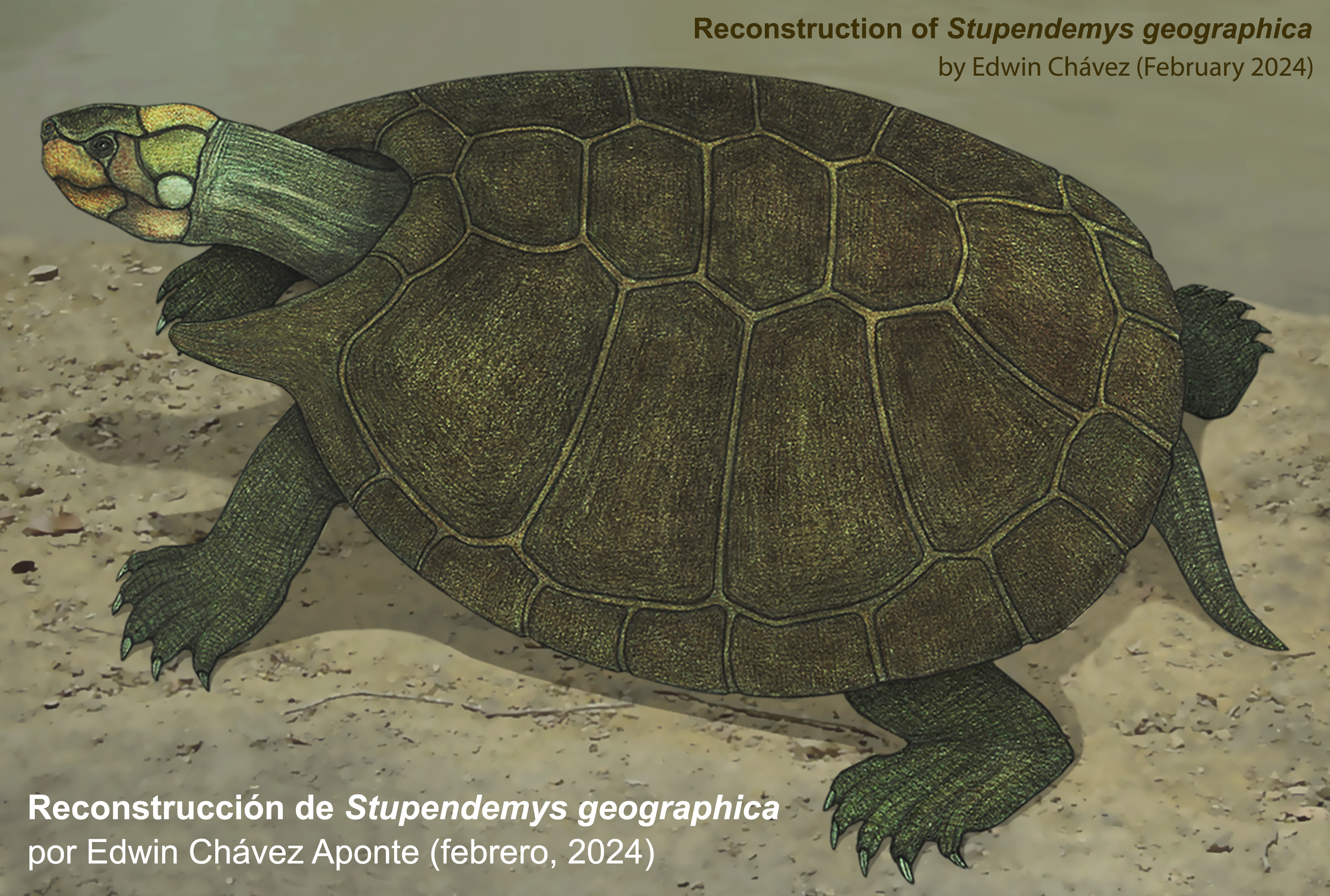
Life reconstruction of a male by Edwin Chávez

Stupendemys is the largest known species of freshwater turtle currently known to science, with several specimens reaching a carapace length exceeding 2 meters. The largest specimen of Stupendemys is CIAAP-2002-01, an almost complete carapace with a parasagittal length of 2.86 meters. This exceeds the size of the Vienna-specimen of the Cretaceous sea turtle Archelon, the largest known turtle, (carapace length 2.20 meters).

The weight of Stupendemys was estimated based on the straight carapace length, with calculations indicating a weight of 871 kg for CIAAP-2002-01 and 744 kg for MCZ(P)-4376, the former largest known specimen of Stupendemys. However, these estimates do not compensate for the large embayment present at the front of the shell. A more precise body mass estimate might be achieved by calculating the average between the results of weight estimates based on midline length and parasagittal length. Applying this method yields a weight of 1,145 kg for the largest Stupendemys specimen.

The evolution of such an enormous size may have been multi-facetted and caused by a combination of factors including pressure from predators, habitat size and favorable climatic conditions, although Stupendemys temporal range indicates that it managed to survive through times of global cooling following the middle Miocene climatic transition (MMCT). Lastly, the giant size could have a phylogenetic link and be ancestral to Stupendemys, with several other related forms being known to have possessed gigantic proportions.

== Phylogeny ==
Although initially believed to be a pelomedusid by Wood, later studies consistently recovered Stupendemys as a podocnemidid turtle instead. In 2020 Stupendemys was recovered as a basal member of Erymnochelyinae. However, this position was influenced by the inclusion of material belonging to Caninemys. In their 2021 publication, Cadena and colleagues again attempted to determine the relationship between Stupendemys and other pan-pleurodiran turtles using the morphological characters established previously by Joyce and colleagues (2021), 268 characters across 104 species of turtles. The analysis was run once with all taxa and once with a focus on Podocnemidoidae, removing all other taxa safe for Proganochelys quenstedti, Notoemys laticentralis, and Platychelys oberndorferi. The single most parsimonious tree resulting from the second analysis recovered Stupendemys as an early branching member of a clade with Peltocephalus dumerilianus at its base. Caninemys, now recognized as a distinct taxon, nested at the base of Erymnochelyinae. Similar results were later recovered in the 2024 description of Peltocephalus maturin.

- Podocnemidoidae
  - Brasilemys josai
  - - Hamadachelys escuilliei
    - - Portezueloemys patagonicus
      - - Bauremys elegans
        - - Cambaremys langertoni
          - - - Peiropemys mezzalirai
              - - Lapparentemys vilavilensis
                - Pricemys caiera
            - Podocnemididae
              - - Cerrejonemys wayuunaiki
                - - Podocnemis vogli
                  - - Podocnemis erythrocephala
                    - - - Podocnemis sextuberculata
                        - Podocnemis bassleri
                      - - Podocnemis expansa
                        - - Podocnemis lewyana
                          - Podocnemis unifilis
              - - - Caninemys tridentata
                  - - - Neochelys arenarum
                      - - Neochelys franzeni
                        - - Erymnochelys madagascariensis
                          - - - Kenyemys williamsi
                              - Papoulemys laurenti
                            - - Neochelys fajumensis
                              - - Carbonemys cofrinii
                                - - Turkanemys pattersoni
                                  - - Dacquemys paleomorpha
                                    - UCMP-42008
                    - - Peltocephalus dumerilianus
                      - - Stupendemys geographica
                        - - Mogharemys blackenhorni
                          - - Cordichelys antiqua
                            - - Latentemys plowdeni
                              - - Bairdemys healeyorum
                                - - - Brontochelys gaffneyi
                                    - - Lemurchelys diasphax
                                      - Shweboemys pilgrimi
                                      - Stereogenys cromeri
                                      - Piramys auffenbergi
                                  - - Bairdemys spp.

== Paleobiology ==
=== Paleoecology ===
Following the 2021 research of Cadena and colleagues, the Pebas Mega-Wetlands housed at least two species of giant side-necked turtles: Stupendemys and Caninemys. Despite their similar size (both sporting a carapace length greater than 2 meters), they vary greatly in skull morphology, with Caninemys proposed to have been deploying a vacuum feeding strategy combined with a strong bite supported by tooth-like structures of the maxilla, while a more durophagous-omnivorous diet has been suggested for Stupendemys. This difference in diet and feeding strategy would be in accordance with Gause's Law, by which two species competing for the same ecological niche cannot coexist with one another for a long period of time without either differentiating or one dominating over the other in the long run. In addition to the different skull morphology, the two taxa may have also been able to coexist due to the sheer size of the Pebas Mega-Wetlands they inhabited, as this ecosystem stretched over most of northern South America during the Middle Miocene. This reason may also prevent the two taxa from being in direct competition over nesting grounds and basking spaces.

The diet of Stupendemys may have been very diverse and broad, possibly including molluscs and other hard shelled prey as well as vertebrate prey as suggested by Meylan and colleagues for Caninemys. At its size it would have been easily capable of consuming various fish, snakes and small crocodilians. A broad dietary width would have helped Stupendemys in maintaining its large body size. Furthermore, Cadena and colleagues also highlight the role of turtles as seed-dispersers in modern-day Amazonia, consuming fruit of palms for example (Arecaceae), seasonally sometimes in great quantities, even if they are not typically part of their standard diet. With its wide gape, Stupendemys would qualify as a megafaunal frugivore and seed disperser.

=== Sexual dimorphism ===
The absence of horns on most Stupendemys specimens indicates that they were not used as a defense mechanism. However, their forward-facing position on the carapace may indicate that they were used in intraspecific combat. Cadena and colleagues hypothesize that the horns may have been a sexually dimorphic trait exclusively found in males, suggesting them to have been used similar to the horns and antlers found in artiodactyls. Among extant turtles similar behavior can be found in snapping turtles, some of the largest freshwater turtles alive, which are known to fight for dominance in overlapping territories. This hypothesis is supported by the presence of a deep, elongated scar along the left horn of CIAAP-2002-01, which could have been left by the horn of a rival male that engaged it in combat. The authors further suggest that in Stupendemys the males may have been the larger sex, similar to the condition seen in the modern podocnemids. However other traditionally sexually dimorphic traits of the turtle shell, such as a deeper anal notch or a xiphiplastral concavity, have not yet been observed in Stupendemys fossils.

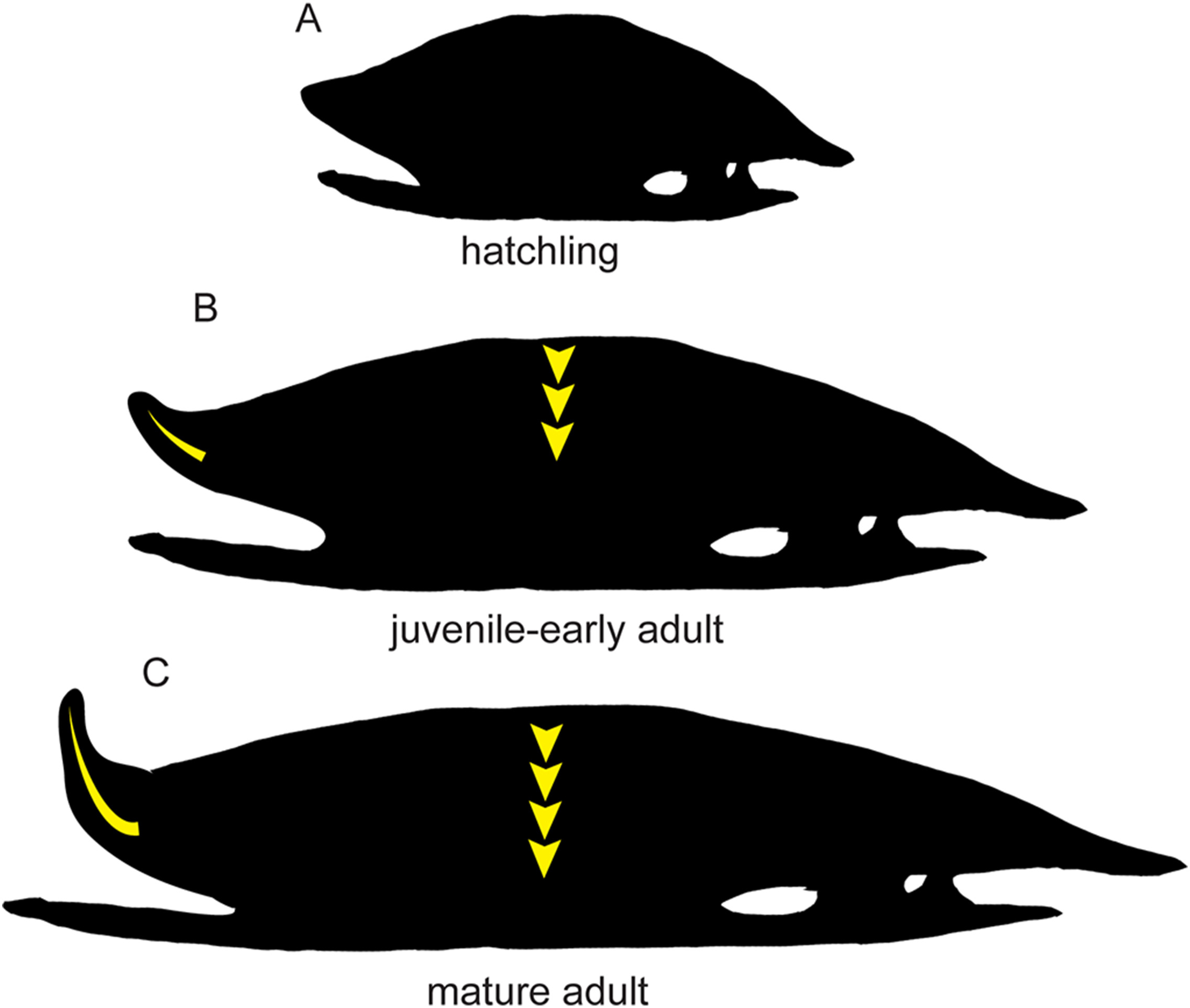
Hypothetical ontogenetic series of Stupendemys geographica

=== Ontogeny ===
Prior to the 2021 study of Cadena and colleagues, only adult specimens of Stupendemys had been described. The discovery of a specimen with a carapace length smaller than 1 meter gives an insight into the changes the animal undergoes while reaching maturity. In addition to its small size, the animal is identified as a juvenile to young adult based on the absence of large horns and shallow anal notch. The inner nuchal notch, anterior expansion of the peripherals 1 and 2, irregular nodular contours, inner contact between the 7th and 8th costals and the relative size of the plastral lobes and their arrangement (except for the pectorals) remains relatively consistent with size.

One of the most significant changes of the carapace of Stupendemys is its height. With age the shell of the turtle grows significantly flatter, while the nuchal region develops a pronounced upturn of its anterior margin and peripheral 1, creating a wide and deep anteromedial embayment of the carapace. The 2nd and 3rd vertebral scutes grow narrower as the animal matures from juvenile to adult, similar to the extant Podocnemis, Erymnochelys and Peltocephalus. The 5th vertebral scute meanwhile belongs the longest and widest of the series in adults while keeping its trapezoid shape. This ontogenetic change of the vertebral scutes means that phylogenetic coding using the width of the vertebral scutes in relation to the pleural scutes should be treated with care due to the variable nature of these features as shown by Stupendemys.

== Paleoenvironment ==
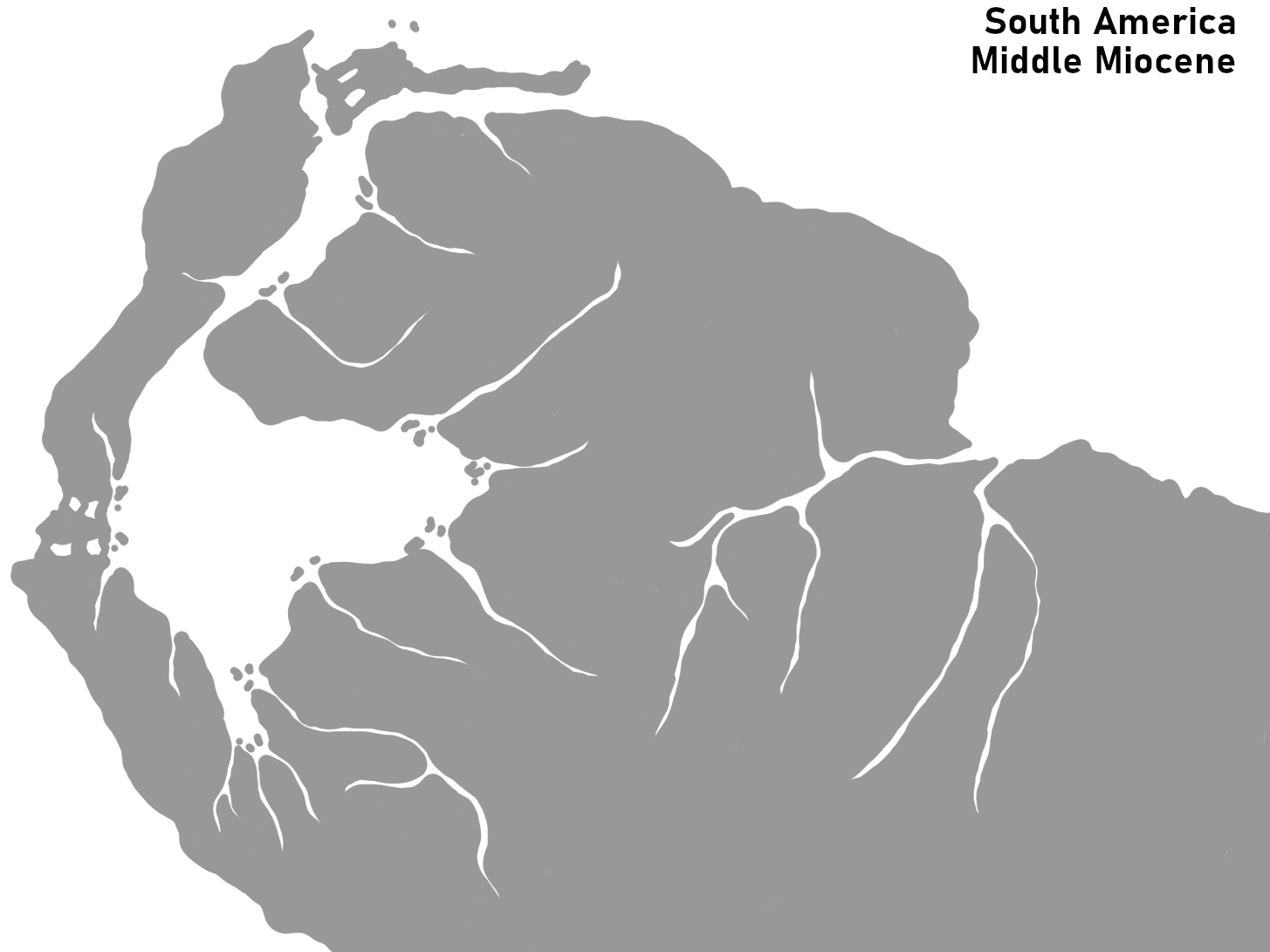
Middle Miocene South America

During the Middle Miocene, the area inhabited by Stupendemys was part of an interconnected series of lakes, rivers, swamps and marshes that drained into the Caribbean known as the Pebas Mega-Wetlands, which included the Colombian La Victoria Formation. The Wetlands provided favorable conditions to the native reptilian fauna, with several lineages of crocodilians reaching enormous sizes during the Mid to Late Miocene and also diversifying in ecology. Some of the enormous crocodilians that coexisted with Stupendemys included the enormous caimain Purussaurus, the bizarre Mourasuchus and large-bodied gharials of the genus Gryposuchus, some species of which reaching lengths of over 10 meters. Some of these crocodilians may have played a role in the evolution of Stupendemys' large body-size, putting pressure on the animal through predation. Bite marks have been found on Colombian and Venezuelan specimens and an isolated tooth was found attached to the ventral surface of CIAAP-2002-01.

As the Pebas System began to disappear with the onset of the transcontinental Amazon Drainage, Stupendemys persisted in the wetlands of the northern Urumaco Formation and the Solimões Formation in Acre State, Brazil, into the Late Miocene before eventually dying out during the Early Pliocene like much of the large crocodilian fauna of the Miocene wetlands. Besides the aforementioned reptiles the waterways of Late Miocene South America were also inhabited by fish, including catfish such as Phractocephalus and Callichthyidae, characids such as Acregoliath rancii and the tambaqui (Colossoma macropomum), the South American lungfish (Lepidosiren paradoxa), trahiras (e.g. Paleohoplias assisbrasiliensis) and freshwater rays and sharks. Other turtles and tortoises found in the same deposits are Chelus columbiana (a fossil relative of the mata mata) and Chelonoidis. Further aquatic vertebrates included river dolphins and the large darter "Anhinga" fraileyi. At least within the Solimões Formation Stupendemys would have inhabited a floodplain or lacustrine environment with savannahs and gallery forests.

== See also ==
- Drazinderetes, a giant prehistoric softshell turtle
- Archelon, a giant sea turtle of the Cretaceous
- Largest prehistoric animals
