= River turtle (disambiguation) =

River turtle may refer to:

- Central American river turtle (Dermatemys mawii), a species of turtle from the Atlantic drainage of Central America
- Brahminy river turtle (Hardella thurjii), a species of turtle endemic to South Asia
- Six-tubercled Amazon River turtle (Podocnemis sextuberculata), a species of turtle found in the Amazon basin
- Big-headed Amazon River turtle (Peltocephalus dumerilianus), a species of turtle found in the Amazon basin
- Arrau turtle (Podocnemis expansa), or Giant South American river turtle, a species of turtle found in the Amazon basin
- Yellow-spotted river turtle, (Podocnemis unifilis) a species of turtle native to South America's Amazon and Orinoco basins
- Pig-nosed turtle (Carettochelys insculpta), or Fly River turtle, a species of turtle native to northern Australia and the Fly River of southern New Guinea
- Murray River turtle or Macquarie River turtle (Emydura macquarii), a species of turtle primarily found in the Macquarie River basin, Australia
- Mary River turtle (Elusor macrurus), a species of turtle endemic to Mary River in Queensland, Australia
- Black wood turtle (Rhinoclemmys funerea), a species of turtle sometimes called the Black river turtle

== See also ==
- River turtles (disambiguation)
