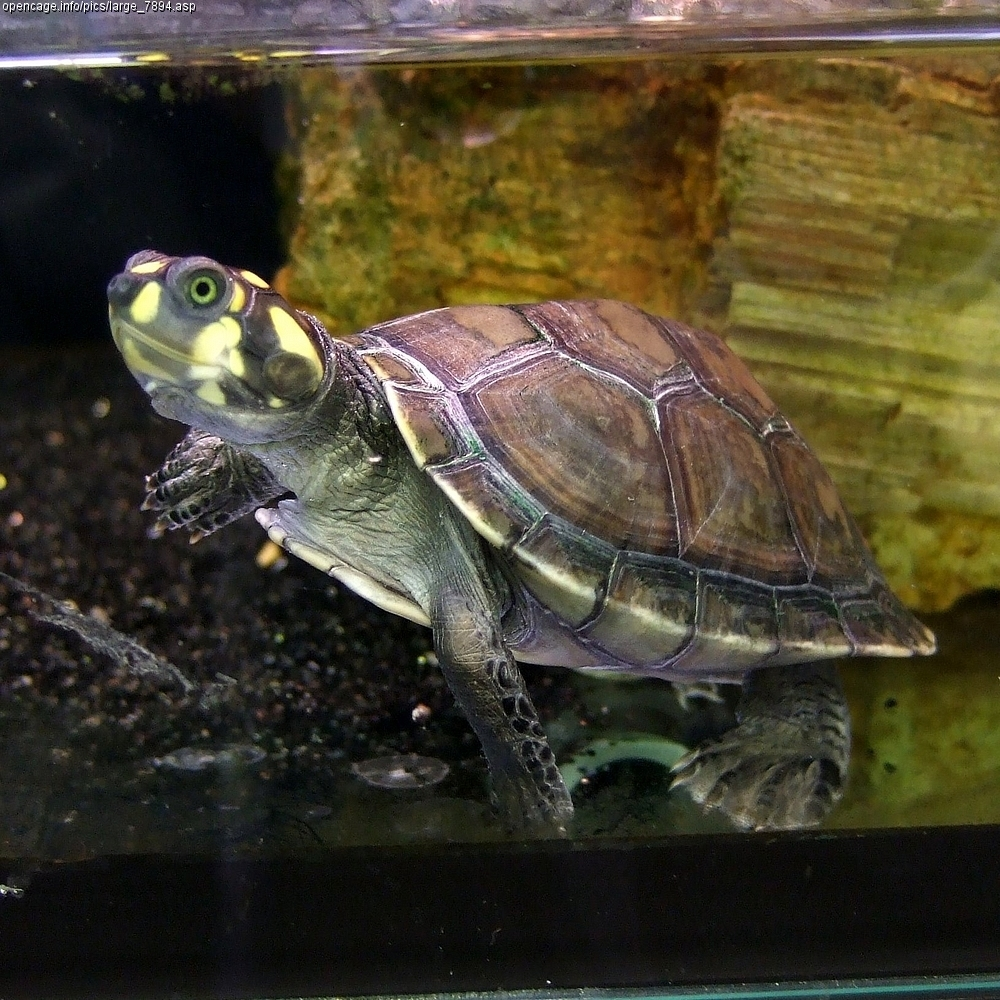
- Podocnemis unifilis, yellow-spotted river turtle

Scientific classification
- Kingdom: Animalia
- Phylum: Chordata
- Class: Reptilia
- Order: Testudines
- Suborder: Pleurodira
- Family: Podocnemididae
- Subfamily: Podocnemidinae
- Genus: Podocnemis; Wagler, 1830

Species
- 6 species, see text

= Podocnemis =

Podocnemis Temporal range: Miocene–Recent

Genus of turtles

Podocnemis is a genus of aquatic turtles, commonly known as South American river turtles, in the family Podocnemididae. The genus consists of six extant species occurring in tropical South America. Four additional species are known only from fossils. These turtles have pig-like noses but are not closely related to the pig-nosed turtle.

== Species ==
These six species are extant.

- Podocnemis erythrocephala (Spix, 1824) – red-headed Amazon River turtle
- Podocnemis expansa (Schweigger, 1812) – Arrau turtle
- Podocnemis lewyana A.H.A. Duméril, 1852 – Magdalena River turtle
- Podocnemis sextuberculata Cornalia, 1849 – six-tubercled Amazon River turtle
- Podocnemis unifilis Troschel, 1848 – yellow-spotted river turtle, yellow-headed sideneck
- Podocnemis vogli L. Müller, 1935 – savanna side-necked turtle

Nota bene: A binomial authority in parentheses indicates that the species was originally described in a genus other than Podocnemis.

=== Fossil species ===
The following four species are extinct, all from Neogene deposits in South America:

- Podocnemis bassleri †
- Podocnemis medemi †
- Podocnemis pritchardi †
- Podocnemis tatacoensis †Cadena & Vanegas, 2023.

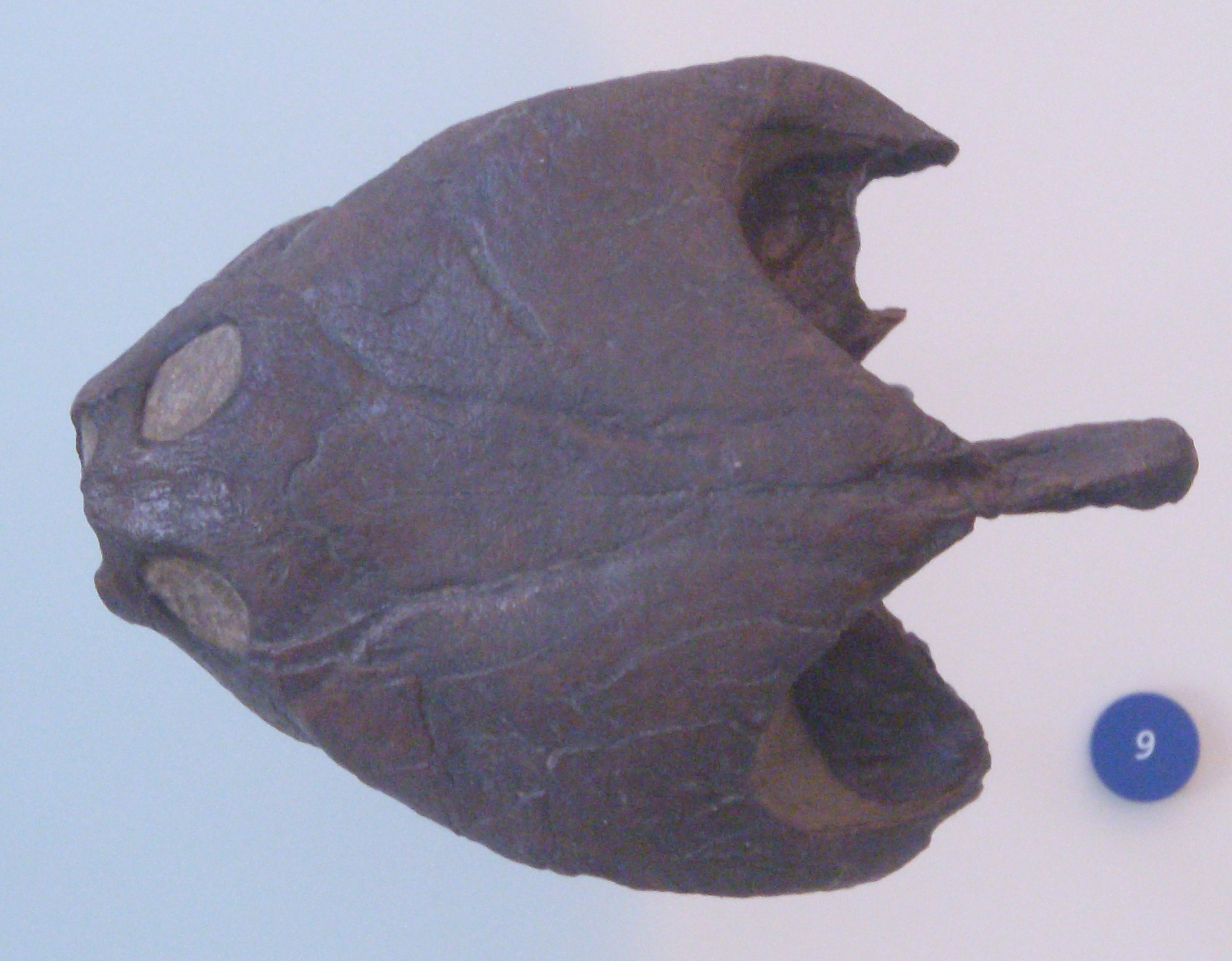
Cast of the skull of the extinct species P. bassleri (AMNH 1662)

The Late Cretaceous (Cenomanian) species "Podocnemis" parva Haas, 1978, based on remains from the West Bank, is now assigned to Algorachelus, as A. parvus.
