= Podocnemis tatacoensis =

Podocnemis tatacoensis Temporal range: Serravallian

Scientific classification
- Domain: Eukaryota
- Kingdom: Animalia
- Phylum: Chordata
- Class: Reptilia
- Order: Testudines
- Suborder: Pleurodira
- Family: Podocnemididae
- Genus: Podocnemis
- Species: †P. tatacoensis

Binomial name
- †Podocnemis tatacoensis Cadena & Vanegas, 2023

Extinct species of turtle

Podocnemis tatacoensis is an extinct species of Podocnemis that lived in Colombia during the Serravallian stage of the Miocene epoch.
