= River turtles =

River turtles may refer to:

- Emydidae, a family of freshwater river turtles including pond turtles, map turtles, box turtles, cooters and sliders
- Dermatemydidae, a family of turtles
  - Central American river turtle, the only extant species of Dermatemydidae
- Geoemydidae or Asian river turtles, a diverse family of turtles found in Asia
- Podocnemididae, a family of turtles occasionally called the American sideneck river turtles

== See also ==
- River turtle (disambiguation)
- Articles containing the words "River turtles"
