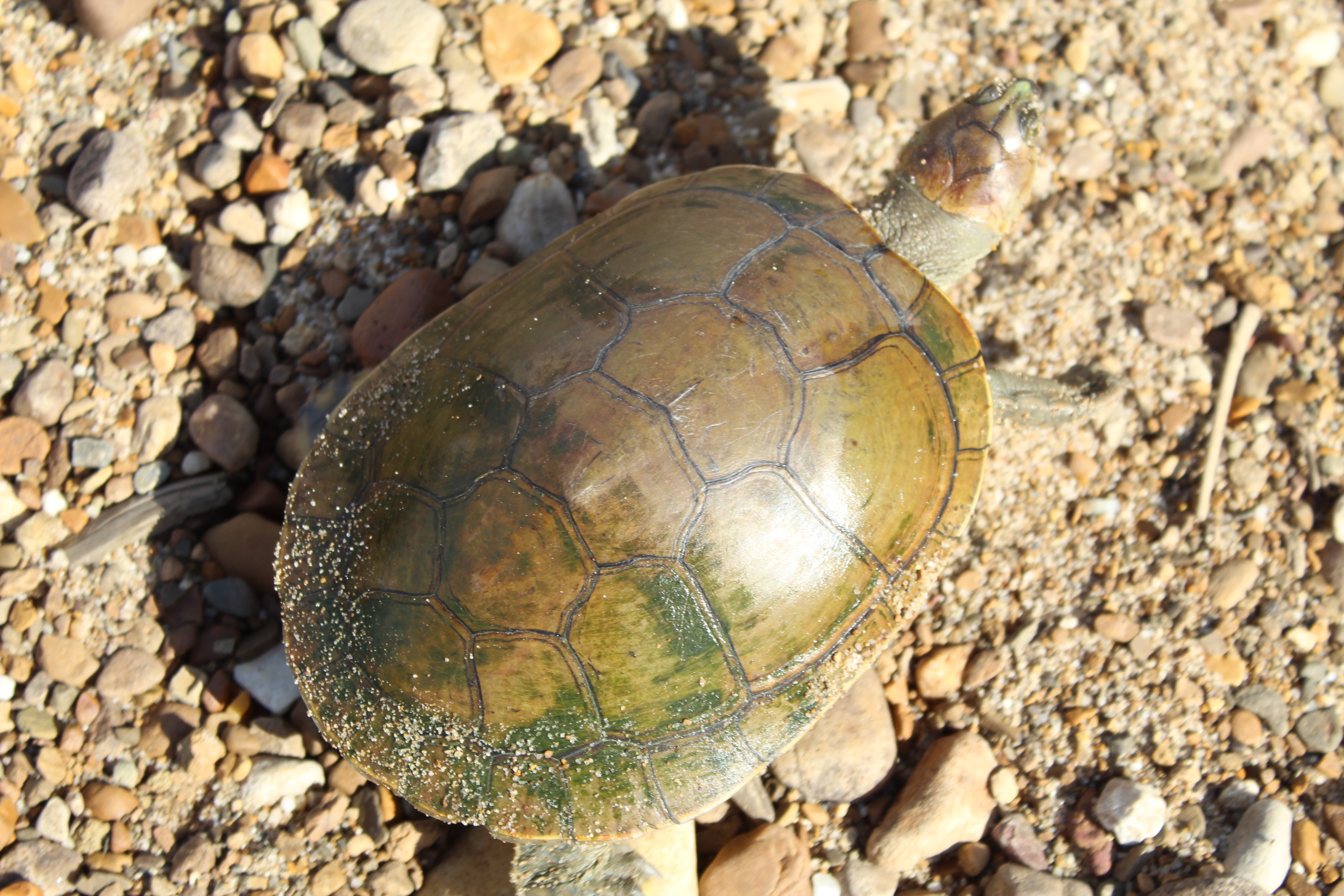

Conservation status
- CITES Appendix II

Scientific classification
- Kingdom: Animalia
- Phylum: Chordata
- Class: Reptilia
- Order: Testudines
- Suborder: Pleurodira
- Family: Podocnemididae
- Genus: Podocnemis
- Species: P. vogli

Binomial name
- Podocnemis vogli L. Müller, 1935

= Savanna side-necked turtle =

Species of turtle

The savanna side-necked turtle (Podocnemis vogli), also commonly known as the Llanos side-necked turtle, is a species of turtle in the family Podocnemididae. The species is endemic to South America.

== Etymology ==
The specific name, vogli, is in honor of Father Cornelius Vogl (1884–1959), who was a Benedictine missionary in Venezuela from 1925 to 1959.

== Geographic range ==
Podocnemis vogli is found in the Orinoco river system in the Llanos in Venezuela and Colombia.

== Gallery ==
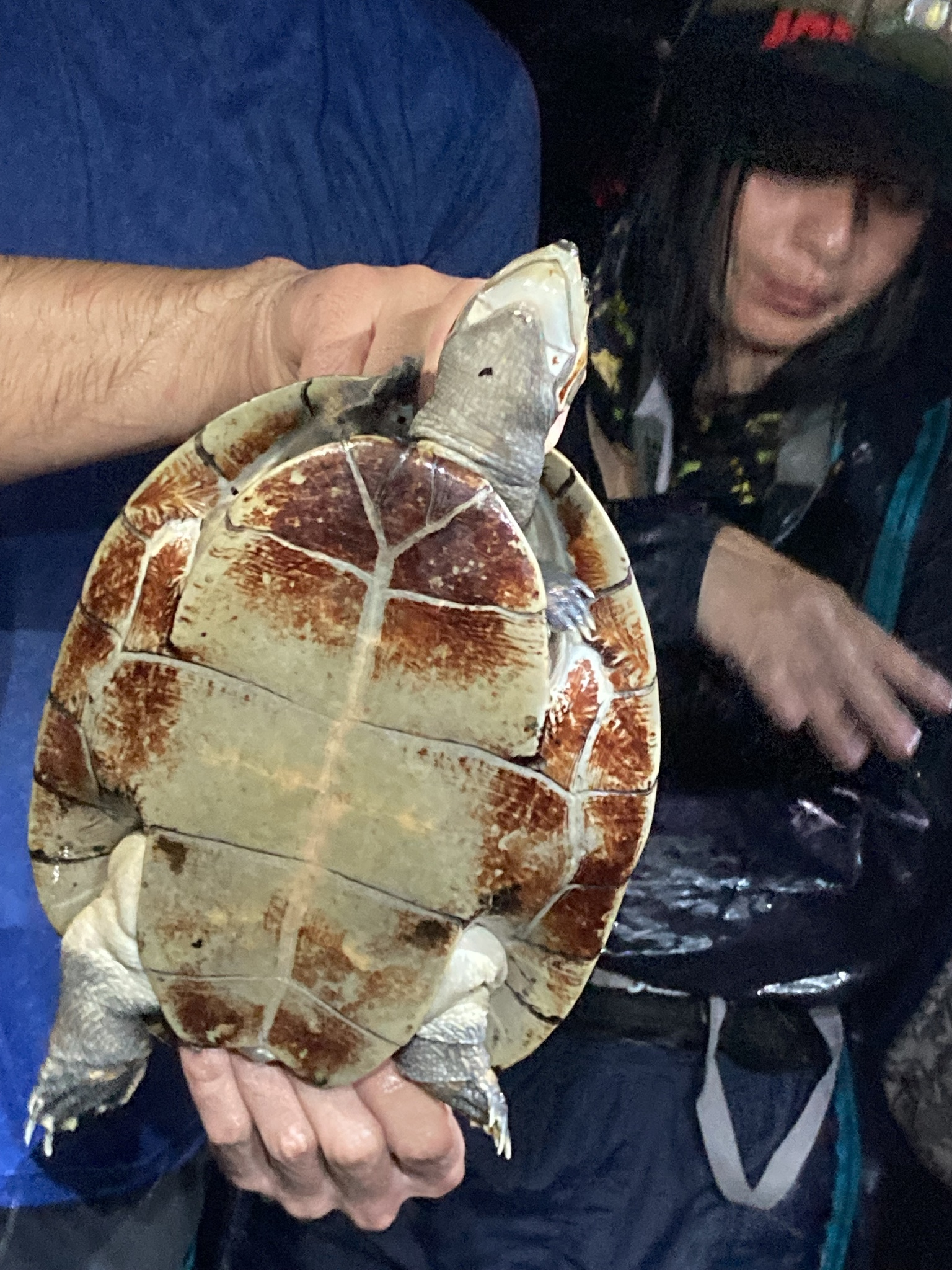
Underside

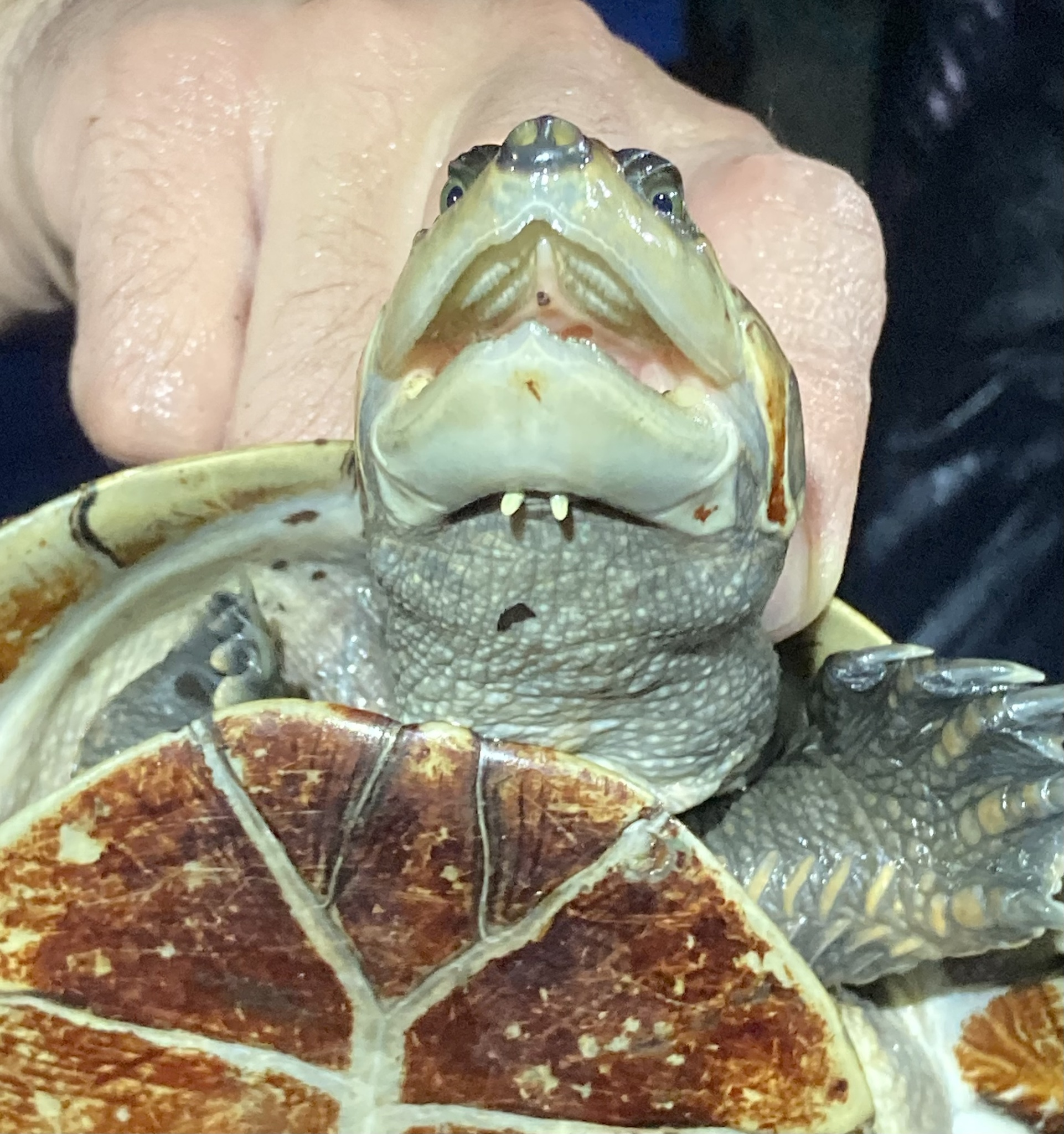
Inside mouth

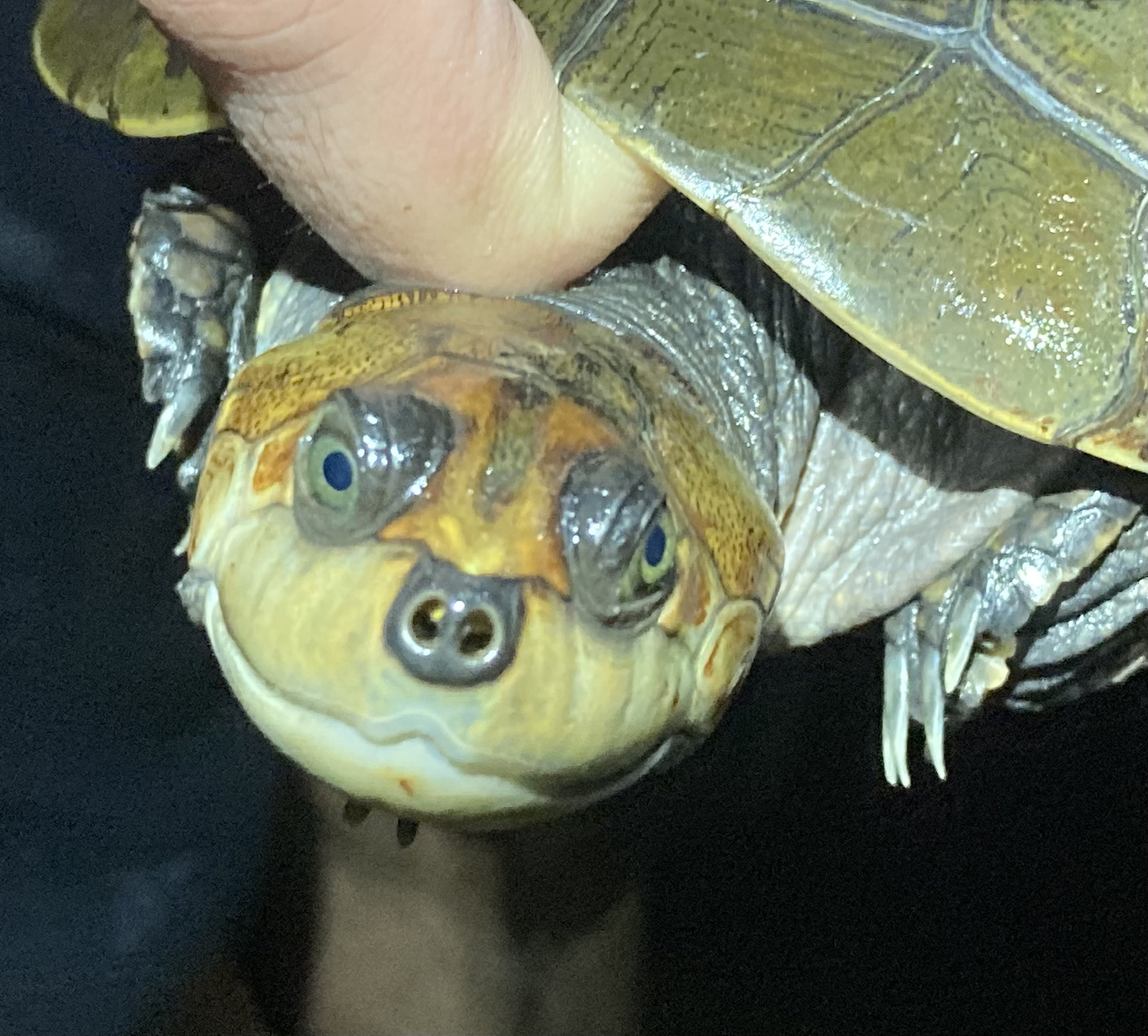
