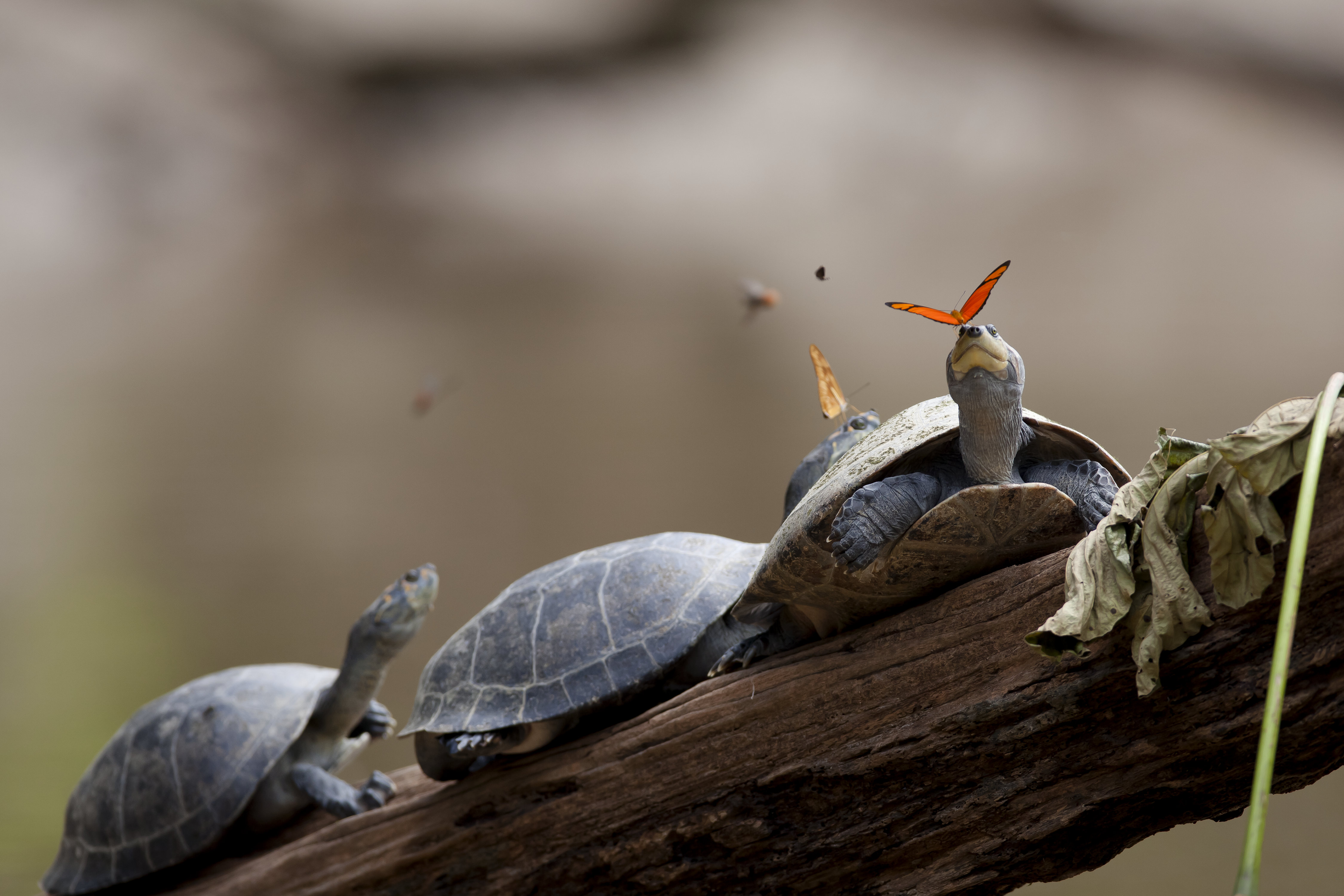

Conservation status
- Vulnerable (IUCN 3.1)
- CITES Appendix II (CITES)

Scientific classification
- Kingdom: Animalia
- Phylum: Chordata
- Class: Reptilia
- Order: Testudines
- Suborder: Pleurodira
- Family: Podocnemididae
- Genus: Podocnemis
- Species: P. erythrocephala

Binomial name
- Podocnemis erythrocephala (Spix, 1824)

= Red-headed Amazon River turtle =

Red-headed Amazon side-necked turtle

Species of turtle

The red-headed Amazon side-necked turtle, red-headed river turtle or red-headed sideneck (Podocnemis erythrocephala) is a species of turtle in the family Podocnemididae. It is found in the Amazon basin in Brazil, Colombia, and Venezuela.

== Description ==
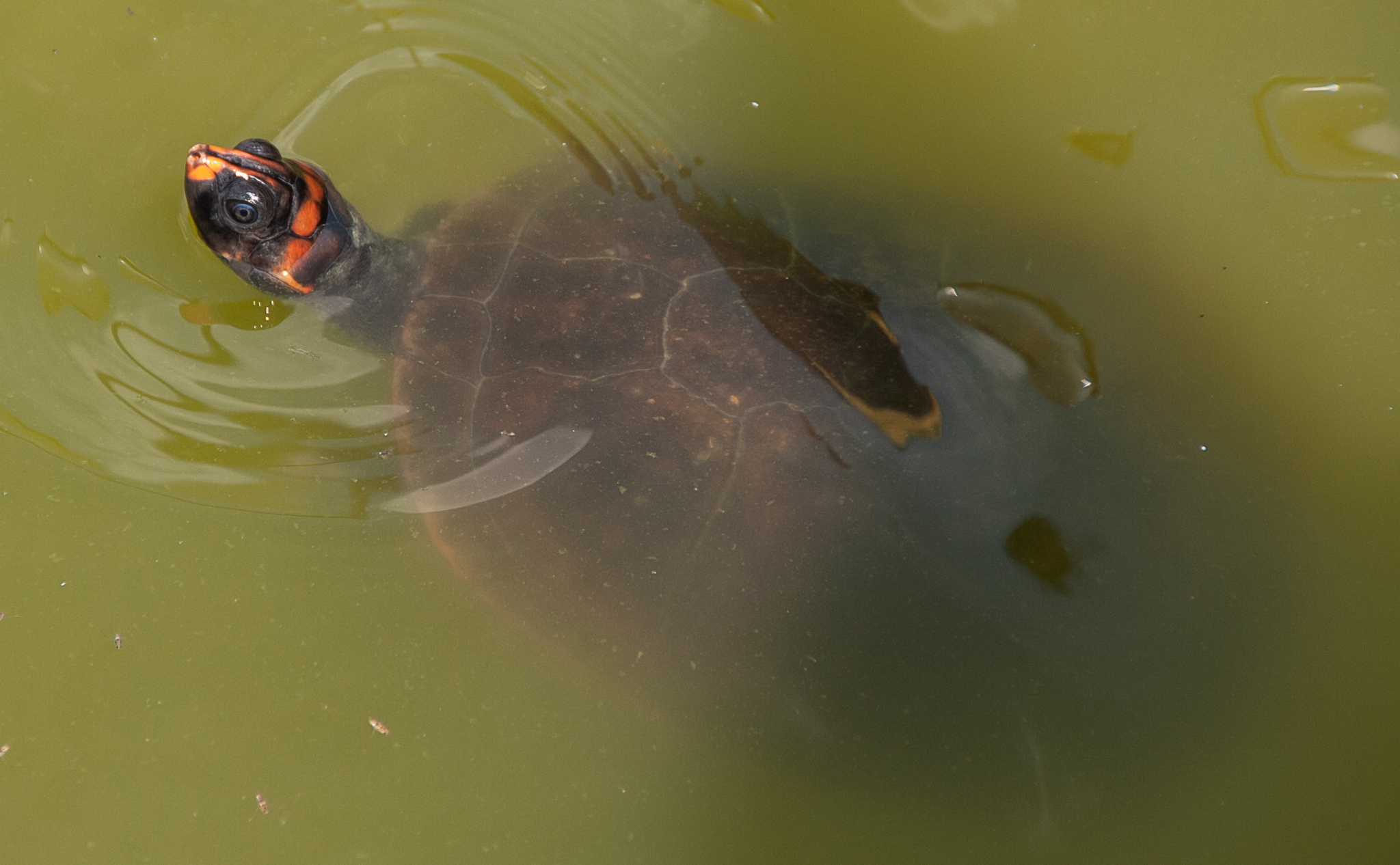
In Brazil

With a size of less than 32 cm (13 in), and weighing usually less than 2.8 kg (6.2 lb), the red-headed river turtle is considered a small one for the area, making it easily distinguishable from other local species.

Identifying features of this turtle include colors ranging from dark brown to black, barbels under the chin, and a bright red strip that goes from behind its head to the tympanum, which is the reason for its name, giving it the red-headed moniker.

== Behaviors ==
=== Reproduction ===
Females will lay anywhere from 2-18 eggs about 4 times a year, though on average will lay about 8. They will nest either on sandy beaches or near the riverside, but ideally prefer extremely dirty water. Like many other turtles, they rely upon temperature-dependent sex determination.

=== Diet ===
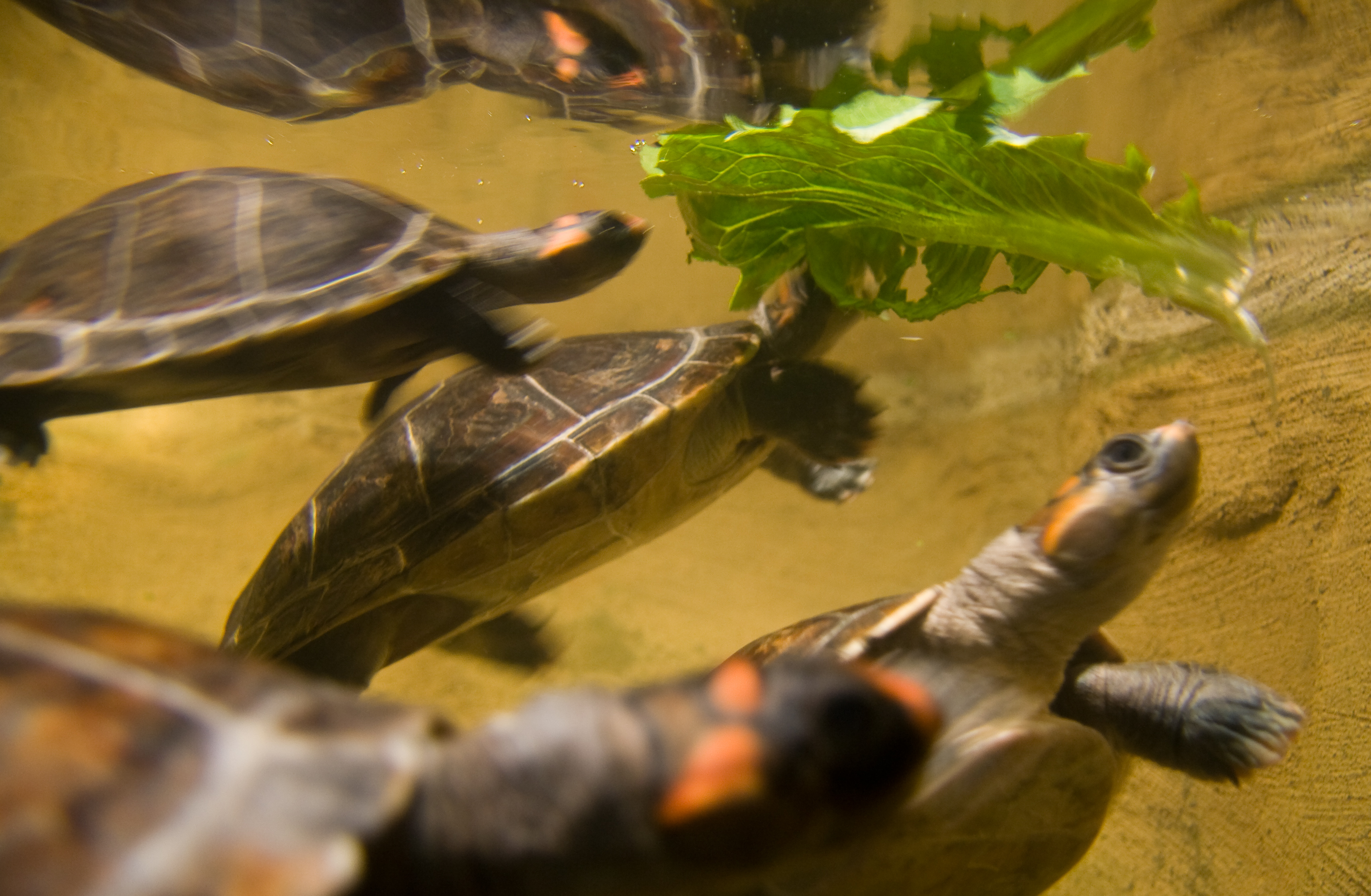
Eating lettuce, San Diego Zoo

This species is herbivorous, and prefers to eat fruits and seeds. It serves an important ecological role because of this, since they serve as important carriers and a dispersal method for many plants and trees in its habitats. Additionally, with all the plant matter it eats, it helps clean the rivers of debris, and serves as nutrient cyclers.

== Conservation ==
This turtle faces some risk from humans, as it is hunted as adults and eggs for sale on the black market in Brazil, Colombia, and Venezuela, despite being protected by law in all three countries. Often, it is poached in or around its common nesting sites. Historically, it has also been consumed as a food source and natural resource for centuries. Currently, this turtle is listed as vulnerable on the IUCN Red List, however that evaluation took place in 1996.
