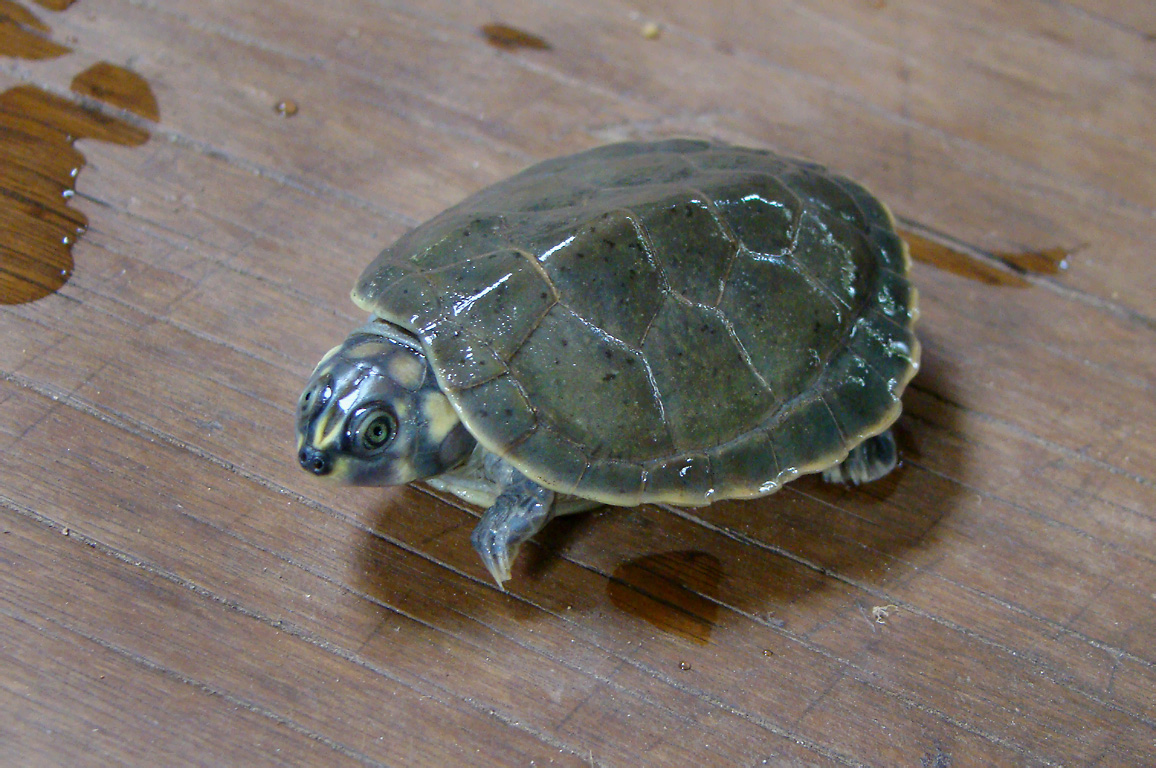
- Young Podocnemis sextuberculata

Conservation status
- Vulnerable (IUCN 2.3)
- CITES Appendix II

Scientific classification
- Kingdom: Animalia
- Phylum: Chordata
- Class: Reptilia
- Order: Testudines
- Suborder: Pleurodira
- Family: Podocnemididae
- Genus: Podocnemis
- Species: P. sextuberculata

Binomial name
- Podocnemis sextuberculata Cornalia, 1849

Synonyms
- Podocnemis expansa Gray, 1856; Podocnemis pitiu Silva Coutinho, 1868; Bartlettia pitipii Gray, 1870; Emys amazonica Baur, 1893

= Six-tubercled Amazon River turtle =

Species of turtle

The six-tubercled Amazon River turtle (Podocnemis sextuberculata), or the six-tubercled river turtle, is a species of turtle in the family Podocnemididae. The turtle is found in the Amazon basin in Brazil, Colombia, Peru and possibly also in Ecuador.

== Taxonomy and names ==
Podocnemis sextuberculata was first described by Emilio Cornalia in an 1849 manuscript. The specific name is derived from Latin for six tubercles, mirroring the English common name for the turtle. In Brazil, the turtle is known commonly as Iaçá (Note: Alternatively spelled as Aiaça, Aiaçá, Aiucá, Ayacá, or Ayassá)—also in Colombia but spelled as Ayasá—Pitiú, Jurara-pitiu (Note: Alternatively spelled as Juara-pitiú.) or Cambêua (Note: Alternatively spelled as Cambeua and Cambeva.) In Colombia and Peru the species is known commonly as Cupiso or Teparo. In English the turtle has also been referred to as the six-tubercled greaved turtle.

== Distribution ==
The turtle is endemic to the Amazon basin, being found in Brazil, Colombia, Peru and possibly also in Ecuador. One population, found in the Branco River part of the basin, is separated from the nearest other population by about 1,800 kilometres (1,100 mi).

== Description ==
The turtle's shell has smooth scales, and a grey to olive brown domed carapace that can reach a length of 34 centimetres (13 in)—relatively small for a member of Podocnemis. The carapace is of an elliptical shape, with a broader back half. The plastron is large, although not large enough to fully cover the carapacial opening, and is coloured yellow and grey to brown. Juveniles start out with the posterior of their carapaces having serrated rims and with their plastrons having six pairs of prominent tubercles. As the turtles mature the serrated part of their rims begin to smoothens out, and their tubercles begin to disappear, although it is not uncommon for remnants of these features to be visible in adults. The turtle's head is broad, with a protruding snout. The head is olive to reddish brown on the top, while the bottom has a cream colouration, and the neck's colouration is similarly darker on top and lighter on the bottom. Juveniles have patterns of light yellow or light green markings on the top of their heads that fade as they mature, except for in females of the isolated population in the Branco River basin, who keep the markings into adulthood. The turtle's limbs have a grey to olive colouration.
