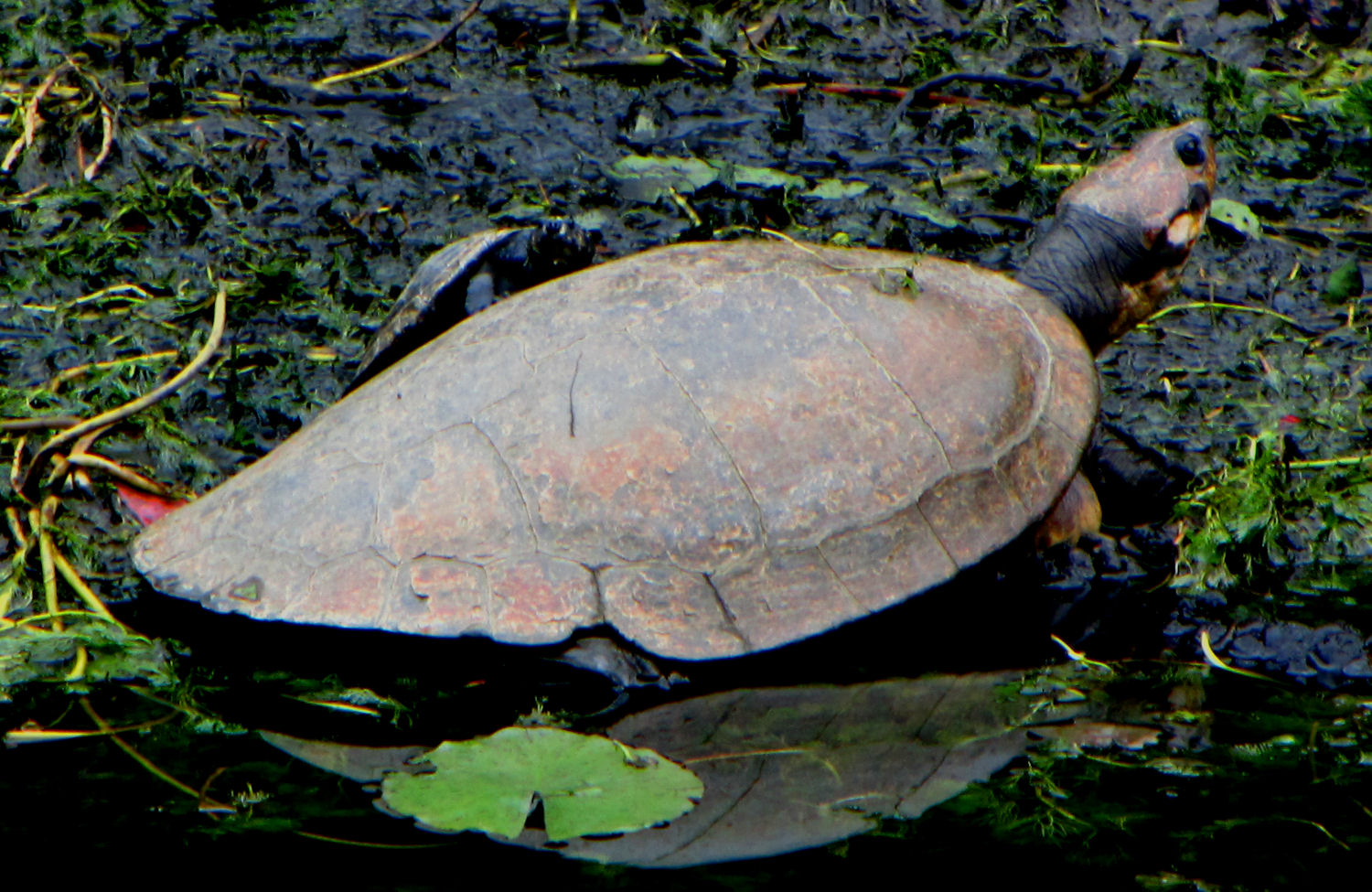
- The turtle in Medellín, Colombia

Conservation status
- Critically Endangered (IUCN 3.1)
- CITES Appendix II

Scientific classification
- Kingdom: Animalia
- Phylum: Chordata
- Class: Reptilia
- Order: Testudines
- Suborder: Pleurodira
- Family: Podocnemididae
- Genus: Podocnemis
- Species: P. lewyana

Binomial name
- Podocnemis lewyana Duméril, 1852
- Range in red

Synonyms
- Podocnemis coutinhii Göldi, 1886

= Magdalena River turtle =

Species of turtle

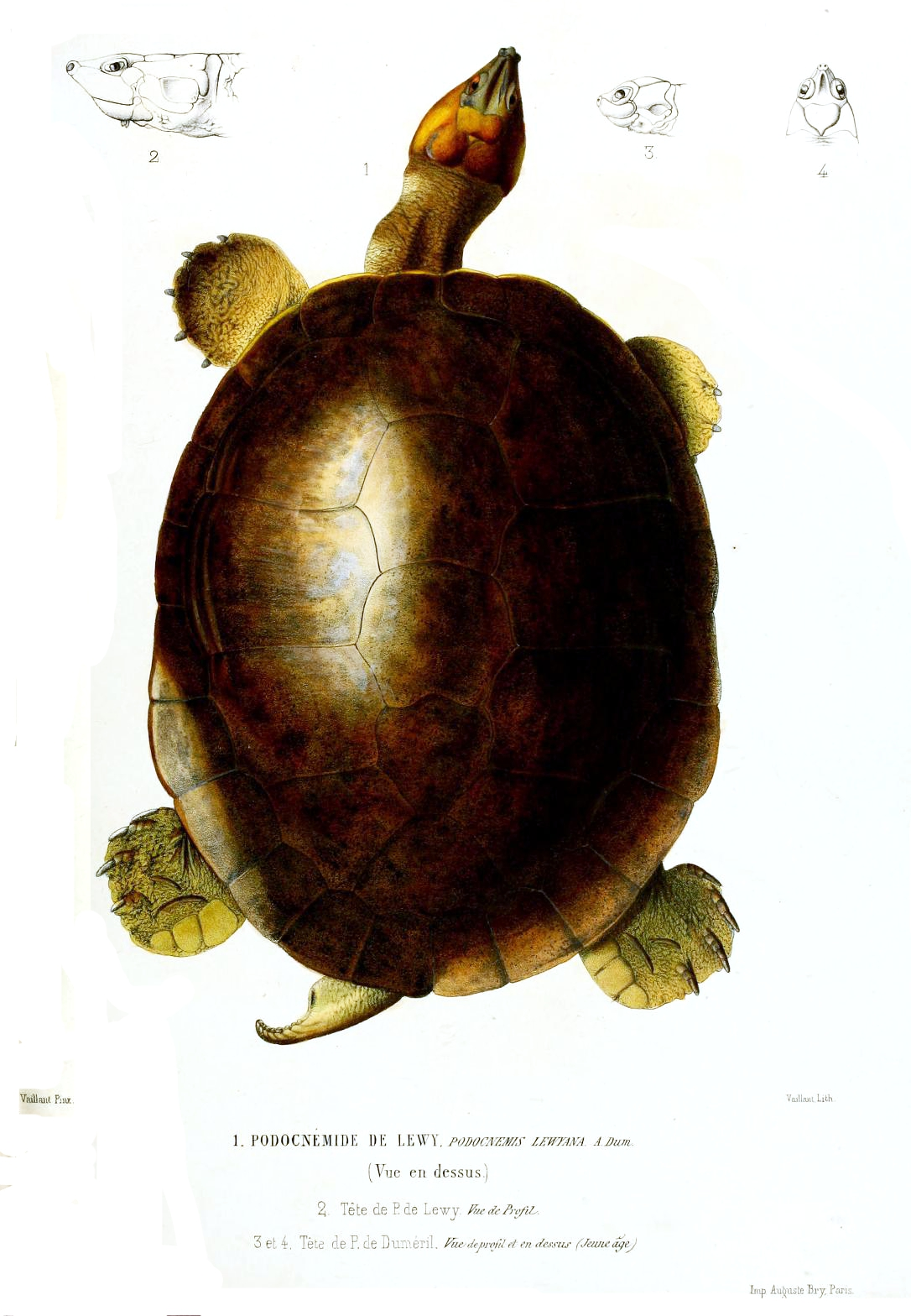
Illustration from 1852

The Magdalena River turtle or Rio Magdalena river turtle (Podocnemis lewyana) is a species of turtle in the family Podocnemididae, which diverged from other turtles in the Cretaceous Period, 100 million years ago. It is endemic to northern Colombia, where its home range consists of the Sinú, San Jorge, Cauca, and Magdalena river basins.

The species has been classified as "Critically Endangered" by the IUCN in 2015 and is considered the most threatened species of the family Podocnemididae. In less than 25 years, the species exhibited a population decline of over 80%. The decline is attributed to habitat destruction, pollution, over-harvest, commercial exploitation, hydrological changes due to electrical generation facilities, and climate change. While early conservation attempts were unsuccessful or unenforced, there has been a resurgence in studies aimed at discovering the most effective approaches.

== Description ==
Magdalena River turtles exhibit sexual dimorphism. Both males and females have a shell composed of shield-like plates that are primarily brown in color. Their necks extend to a robust head.

Males have grayish-brown head scales, while females display head scales more reddish-brown in color. Adult males, on average, weigh 1.6 kg and measure 24.6 cm in carapace length. Whereas females, on average, weigh 5.6 kg and measure 37 cm in carapace length.

The species is regarded as having a mostly herbivorous diet, however opportunistic insectivorous behavior has been observed. At times, juveniles pursue piscivorous behavior. Average life span is 10–15 years in the wild.

== Ecology ==
=== Reproduction ===
Magdalena River turtles are iteroparous. Males sexually mature at 3–4 years old, while females mature at 5–6 years old. Females nest in the sandy riverbanks that result from areas of shallow water.

There are two nesting seasons: December–January and June–July. It is unclear if individual females nest during both seasons in the same year. Higher egg counts are observed in the June–July nesting season.

While average egg weight is significantly greater in the December–January nesting season. Therefore, researchers have proposed it is equally vital to protect both seasons, as egg weight is positively correlated to hatching weight.

Average clutch size is 22 eggs. The embryos within the eggs have temperature-dependent sex determination. The species' pivotal temperature (T_{piv}), incubation temperature that produces 1:1 sex ratio, is 33.4 °C. Incubation temperatures below the pivotal temperature produce a greater percentage of male hatchlings, while temperatures above produce a greater percentage of female hatchlings. Concerns have been raised about the effects of climate change on this evolved developmental strategy.

=== Movement ===
Among freshwater turtles, podocnemidids have among the longest aquatic migratory patterns, rarely leaving the water except to bask. Their average home range spans between 10.3 and 14.6 ha. Movement patterns are predicated on sex, body size, food availability, habitat quality, season, reproductive status, and life stage.

Seasonal movements are most prominent due to changing water levels. Research has shown increased movement to deeper waters, likely as a result of climate change.

== Conservation ==
=== Threats ===
As of 2018, 37% of all freshwater and terrestrial turtle species found in Colombia were classified as "Threatened". Despite legislation passed in 1964 aimed at protecting these species (Ministry of Agriculture Resolution No. 0214-1964), their populations have continually decreased. While many anthropogenic factors have contributed to the decline of Magdalena River turtles, over-harvest and climate change are the most prominent. Over-harvest results from human demand for Magdalena River turtle consumption.

Locals believe that feeding on the turtles offer many medicinal qualities. These include easing pregnancy recovery, curing diseases, boosting strength and longevity, and creating natural aphrodisiacs. Climate change has led to discernible changes in temperature-dependent sex determination and movement patterns. It has also contributed to nesting site flooding and other habitat alterations.

While anthropogenic causes are most pronounced, several life history factors contribute to the Magdalena River turtles endangerment, as well. High rates of mortality are seen in eggs, hatchlings, and juveniles. Despite their high rates of survival as subadults and adults, their slow, r-selected growth means it takes a while for those stages to be reached. They also require multiple habitats, one for nesting and another for feeding, which result in strenuous migrations.

=== Conservation approaches ===
The most commonly used conservation approach for Magdalena River turtle conservation is "head-starting". However, research efforts have been focused on finding more effective means on conservation, as understanding of the turtles' endangered nature is relatively novel. A study that compiled 16 ecological knowledge criteria of Colombian freshwater and tortoise species suggested that the Magdalena River turtle should receive top conservation priority. Studies are applying faster demographic modeling and surveying to better understand the species and establish practical conservation efforts. Faster demographic modeling of the species' vital rates is focused on analyzing the contributions of each life stage and intrinsic growth rates (r). Surveying has shown that local Magdalena River turtle consumption habits have changed and knowledge of their ecological role has improved. This suggests that community-based strategies, including distribution of educational material, is proving effective in the conservation effort of Magdalena River turtles.
