= Emilio Cornalia =

Italian naturalist

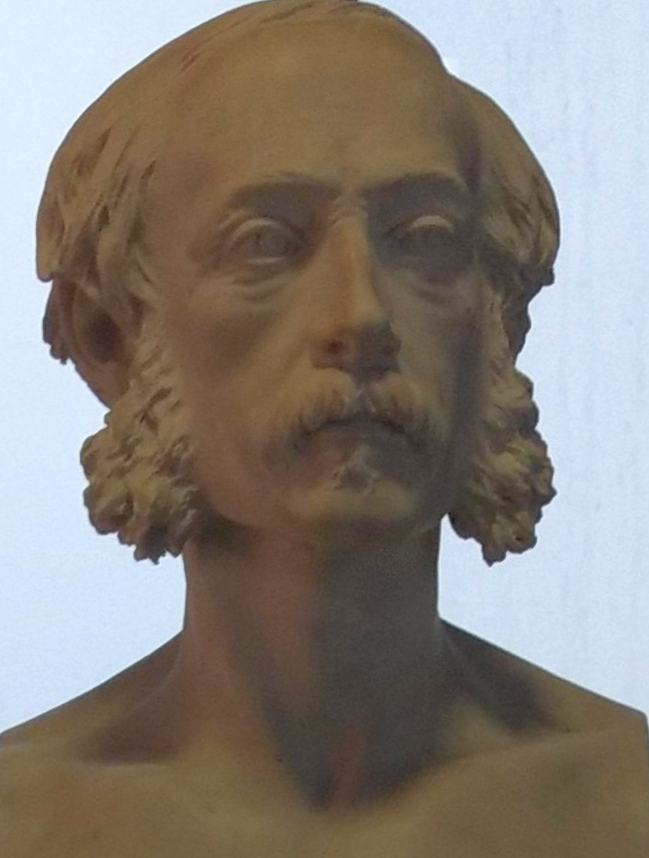
- Born: Emilio Cornalia; 25 August 1824
- Died: 8 June 1882 (aged 57)

Emilio Cornalia (25 August 1824 – 8 June 1882) was an Italian naturalist. He was born in Milan and died in the same city. He was conservator from 1851 to 1866, and director from 1866 till his death, of the Milan Museum of Natural History, and was interested in all areas of biology.

He was one of the group of leading scientists instrumental in founding La Società Entomologica Italiana, the Italian Entomological Society. He was the author of important works of applied entomology, such as Monografia del bombice del gelso published in 1856, and was part of a scientific expedition to the upper Nile valley in 1873.

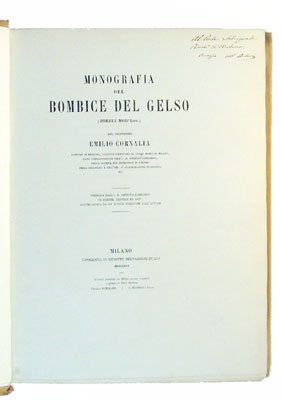
Monografia del bombice del gelso

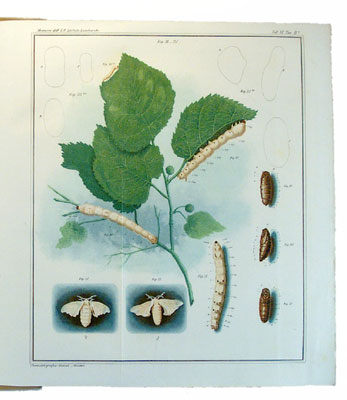
Monografia del bombice del gelso

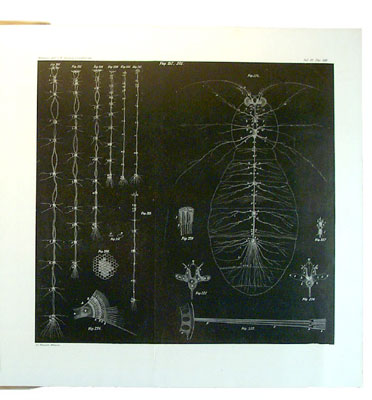
Monografia del bombice del gelso
