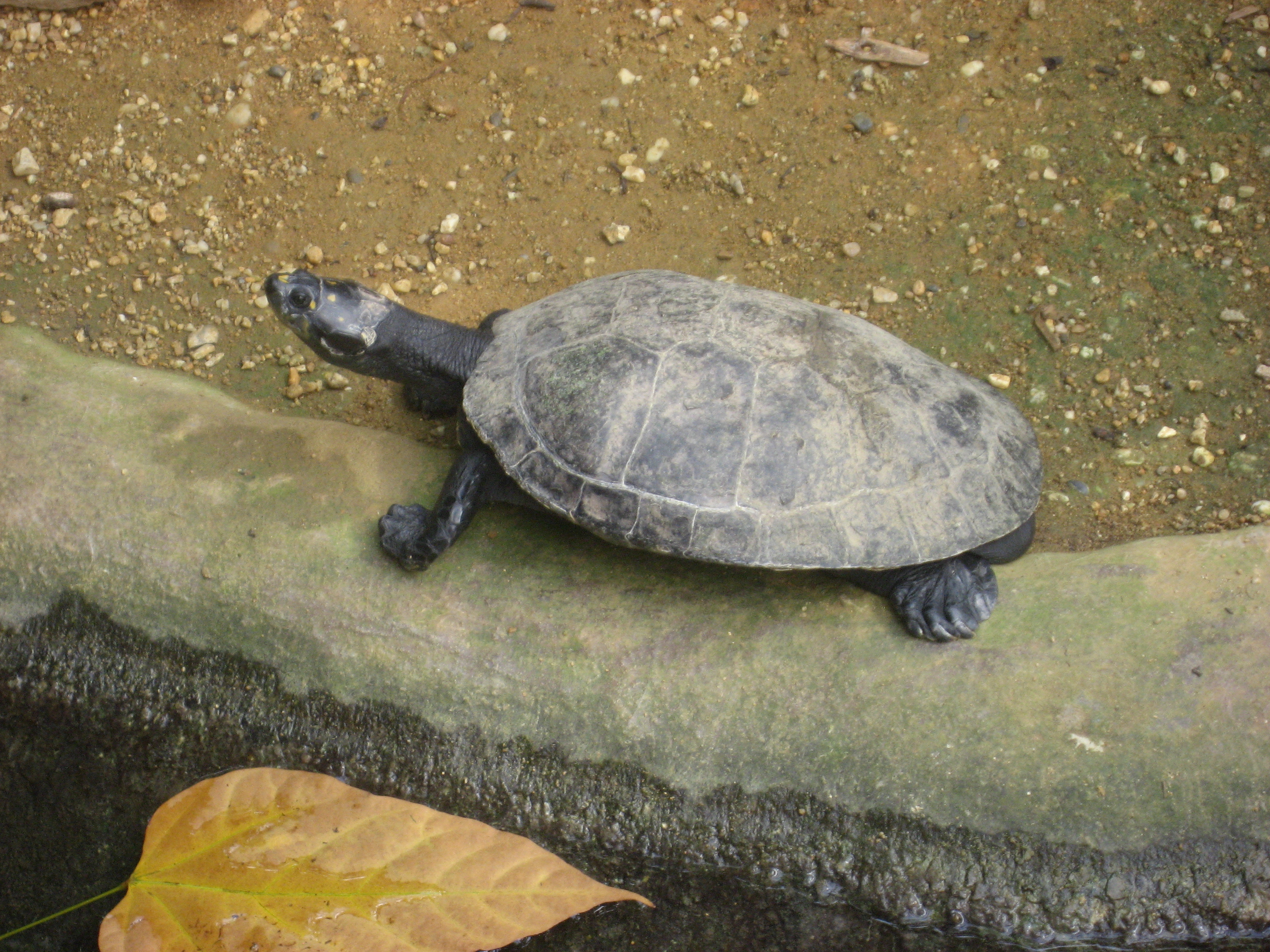
- Adult at Krefeld Zoo

Conservation status
- Vulnerable (IUCN 3.1)
- CITES Appendix II

Scientific classification
- Kingdom: Animalia
- Phylum: Chordata
- Class: Reptilia
- Order: Testudines
- Suborder: Pleurodira
- Family: Podocnemididae
- Genus: Podocnemis
- Species: P. unifilis

Binomial name
- Podocnemis unifilis Troschel, 1848

Synonyms
- Emys cayennensis Schweigger, 1812: 298.; Chelys (Hydraspis) Cayennensis, Gray, 1831: 17; Hydraspis Cayennensis, Gray, 1831: 42; Emys Terekay Schinz, 1833: 41; Podocnemis dumeriliana Duméril & Bibron, 1835: 387 (in part); Podocnemis unifilis Troschel, 1848: 647; Podocnemis tracaya Coutinho, 1868: 149; Chelonemys dumeriliana, Gray, 1870: 83 (in part); Podocnemis cayennensis, Siebenrock, 1902: 1623

= Yellow-spotted river turtle =

Yellow-spotted Amazon river turtle

Species of turtle

The yellow-spotted Amazon river turtle (Podocnemis unifilis), also known commonly as the yellow-headed sideneck turtle and the yellow-spotted river turtle, and locally as the taricaya, is one of the largest South American river turtles.

Podocnemis unifilis is a type of side-necked turtles, so called because they do not pull their heads directly into their shells, but rather bend their necks sideways to tuck their heads under the rim of their shells. Side-neck turtles are classified as members of the suborder Pleurodira.

== Description ==
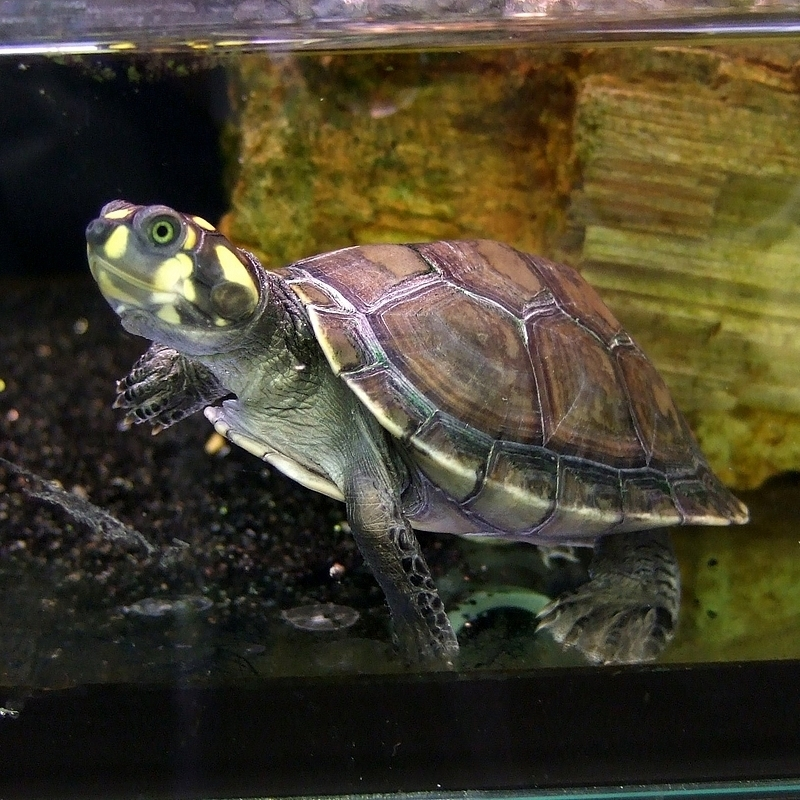
Juvenile

Podocnemis unifilis is a large turtle, and can grow up to 45 cm long and weigh up to 8 kg. This species can be recognized by its black or brown oval carapace (upper shell) with distinctive low keels on the second and third scutes. Yellow spots on the side of its head give this species its common name. These spots are most prominent in juveniles and fade with age. Females can be up to twice the size of males.

== Distribution and habitat ==
These turtles are native to South America's Amazon and Orinoco basins, as well as rivers systems of the Guianas. They are found in tributaries and large lakes, naturally calm waters.

== Ecology ==
During the flood season, turtles may venture into flooded forests or floodplain lakes. They feed on fruits, seeds, weeds, aquatic plants, fish, and small invertebrates.

The females lay two clutches of eggs each year, each with four to 35 eggs in it. They make their nests in sandy areas on the banks of rivers, where the eggs will hatch 66 to 159 days after they are laid. The eggs are laid at the peak of dry season so the nest will not be washed away with the floods of the rainy season. Eggs incubated below 32 degrees Celsius will hatch as males, while those incubated above 32 degrees Celsius will hatch as females. Within a few days after hatching, the young turtles begin to forage for food alone. This food includes vegetable matter, grasses, fruits, leaves, carrion and mollusks.

== Threats and conservation ==
Podocnemis unifilis was one of the foreign species exploited by the American pet turtle trade in the 1960s. This species is at risk of predation by humans, birds, snakes, large fish, frogs and mammals. Importation of this species is now strictly regulated by federal law, but a captive, self-sustaining population exists in the United States – some groups in zoos, others in the hands of private collectors. Individuals of this species have lived more than 30 years in captivity.
