= Elizabeth Pope =

Elizabeth Pope may refer to:

- Elizabeth Younge (died 1797), later Pope, English actress
- Elizabeth Marie Pope (1917–1992), American author and educator
- Elizabeth Carrington Pope, New Zealand-born zoologist and marine biologist
- Elizabeth Carney Pope, American painter
