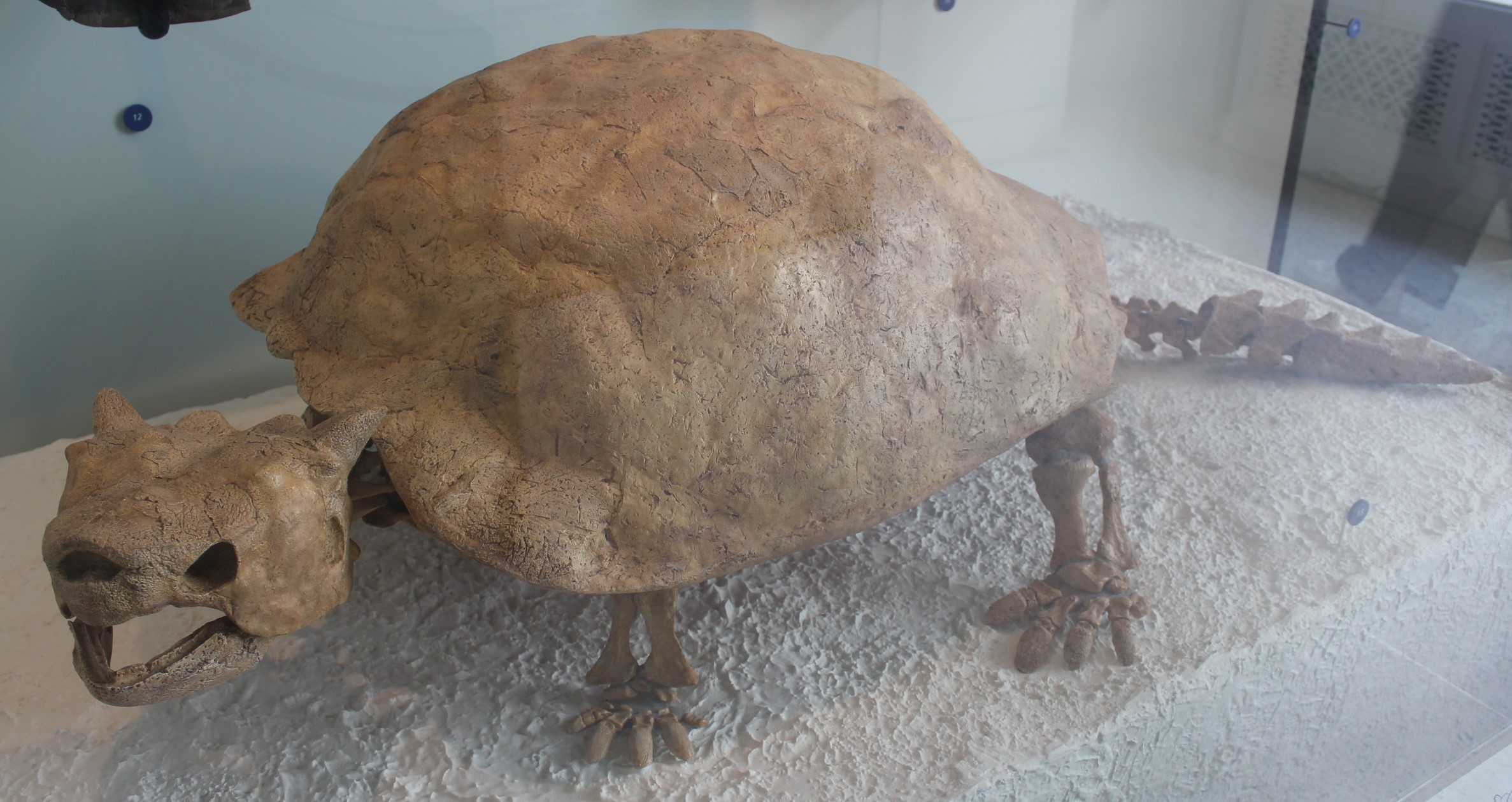
- Cast of a Meiolania platyceps skeleton, American Museum of Natural History

Scientific classification
- Kingdom: Animalia
- Phylum: Chordata
- Class: Reptilia
- Clade: Pantestudines
- Clade: Testudinata
- Family: †Meiolaniidae
- Genus: †Meiolania; Owen, 1886

Species
- Meiolania brevicollis Megirian, 1992; Meiolania platyceps Owen, 1886; Meiolania mackayi Anderson, 1925; ?Meiolania damelipi White, 2010

Synonyms
- Ceratochelys Huxley, 1887; Miolania Woodward, 1901

= Meiolania =

Meiolania Temporal range: mid Miocene–Holocene

Extinct genus of turtles

Meiolania is an extinct genus of meiolaniid stem-turtle native to Australasia throughout much of the Cenozoic. Meiolania was a large turtle, with the shell alone ranging from 0.7–2 m (2 ft 4 in – 6 ft 7 in) in length. Four species are currently recognized, although the validity of two of them is disputed. Meiolania was first described as a species of lizard related to Megalania by Richard Owen towards the end of the 19th century, before the continued discovery of additional fossils solidified its placement as a kind of turtle.

The best known species is M. platyceps, known from hundreds of specimens collected in Pleistocene strata of Lord Howe Island. The oldest known species is M. brevicollis from the Miocene of mainland Australia. Other species include M. mackayi from Pleistocene New Caledonia, which may be synonymous with M. platyceps, ? M. damelipi from Holocene Vanuatu, which may represent a non-meiolaniid turtle, and the Wyandotte species, an unnamed form from Pleistocene Australia tentatively identified as M. cf. platyceps by meiolaniid researcher Eugene S. Gaffney. Additional fossil remains indicate the presence of Meiolania or a close relative in multiple localities across Australia, New Caledonia and Fiji.

Meiolania was a well-armored animal with a somewhat raised carapace with spiky edges, osteoderm-covered front limbs, a head adorned by massive cow-like horns and a tail encased by spiked tail rings and tipped by a large bony club. It has been hypothesized that many of these features could have been used either in self-defense or in intraspecific combat during the mating season. Furthermore, the horns could have served a role during foraging, helping the animal brush aside foliage while grazing. The discovery of fossil nests and certain adaptations against sand entering its nasal cavity indicate that they spent at least some time in arid regions or on the beaches of the islands they inhabited.

Neither the dispersal nor the extinction of Meiolania are fully understood. Several hypotheses have been proposed ranging from it spreading across the now submerged continent of Zealandia to it swimming between islands (the latter of which is now considered unlikely based on its heavy build and lack of aquatic adaptations). The extinction of this turtle was most likely a multi-facetted process with ties to climate change, reduction of its native territory by rising sea levels, predation from invasive livestock and possibly hunting by humans. However, some of the youngest records are uncertain, with the roughly 3.000 year old ?M. damelipi possibly being another type of turtle and the even younger, ca. 2.000-1.500 year old, Pindai Cave meiolaniid being indeterminate at a genus level.

== History and naming ==
=== Early research ===
Perhaps the first recorded discovery of meiolaniid remains stems from John Foulis, a doctor who lived on Lord Howe Island halfway through the 19th century. Foulis mentioned that he discovered the bones of a turtle when describing the island's geology, with later authors claiming that he sent a skull to an unspecified museum. While records of his writing exist, the later claim could not be verified and remains questionable. More scientists arrived on the island around 1869 on the ship Thetis following the murder of a resident. Among these scientist was botanist and poet Robert D. FitzGerald, who according to Clarke (1875) discovered fossil turtles. However this claim too could not be verified by later research, as could the claim that another collection was made by a Mr. Leggatt, despite the fact that these remains were supposedly sent to British paleontologist Richard Owen. However, there are records of FitzGerald writing to Owen regarding later discoveries on Lord Howe Island and notes on turtle remains recorded by zoologist Edward P. Ramsay. Another early record tells of meiolaniid remains being collected by geologist H. Wilkinson during yet another Thetis expedition to the island in 1882.

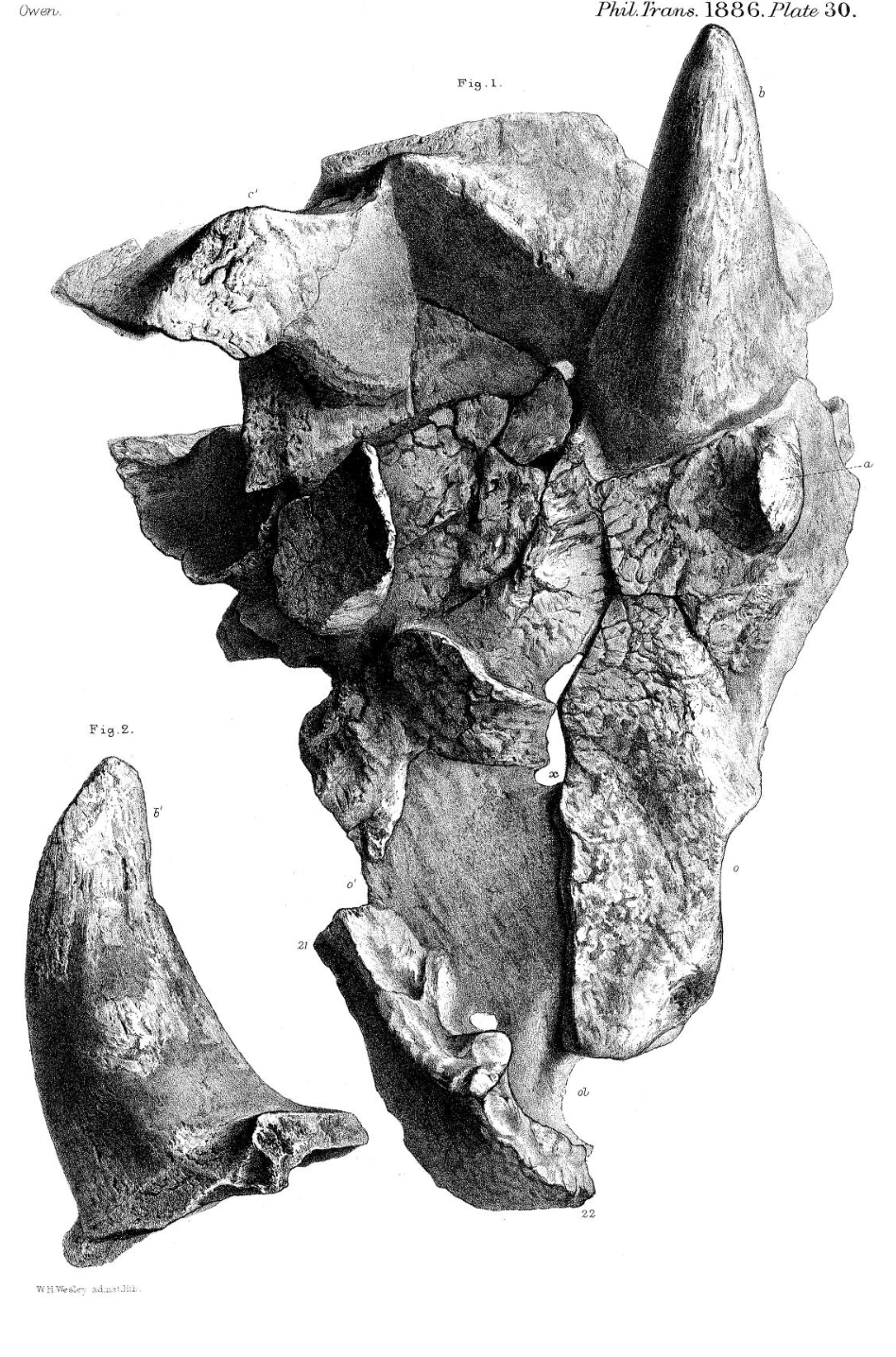
The holotype skull

In 1884 turtle fossils once again found their way into the possession of FitzGerald, who proceeded to send the remains to Owen in London. It is noted that the collection of Meiolania remains seemingly reached a highpoint around this time, yet was poorly recorded in contrast to the well known history of less prolific expeditions. Multiple researchers appear to have been actively collecting turtle fossils at the time, including FitzGerald and Wilkinson who were seemingly unaware of each other's efforts despite working for the same institution. In London meanwhile, Owen noted that the fossils of Lord Howe Island were similar to a skull discovered several years prior in Queensland, which he had attributed to the giant squamate Megalania (at the time thought to be a giant relative of the thorny devil rather than a monitor lizard). What has been noted as strange about Owen's conclusion is that he identified the fossils as those of a lizard despite the fact that multiple researchers in correspondence with him had already recognized them as belonging to a turtle. Owen saw the discovery of the Lord Howe Island material as evidence for a smaller relative of Megalania, which he subsequently named Meiolania. BMNH R675, an incomplete and damaged skull embedded in hardened calcarenite, was chosen to serve as the holotype for the genus and although its precise age and location is not known, Eugene S. Gaffney suggests it may have come from the 100,000 to 120,000 year old rocks of Ned's Beach. The fossils were originally assigned to two distinct species, M. platyceps and M. minor, tho the latter has since then been sunk into M. platyceps.

Not long after Owen named Meiolania, more and more material was published, including fossils much better preserved than the holotype, which have led to revisions regarding Meiolanias classification. In 1887 Thomas Henry Huxley agreed with collectors in that Meiolania was not a lizard but a type of turtle, which he named Ceratochelys sthenurus. In addition to erecting Ceratochelys, Huxley also referred the Queensland skull to this new genus. Meanwhile, upon receiving some additional fossil remains collected by Wilkinson (including a fully preserved skull), Owen came to believe that Meiolania was related to both lizards and turtles and thus placed the animal in a group he called Ceratosauria (a name already occupied by a clade of dinosaurs). When the fossils were examined by George Albert Boulenger, he sided with Huxley, but placed the animal in Pleurodira (side-necked turtles) rather than Cryptodira. This was the first of a long series of differing opinions on the relationship between meiolaniids and modern turtles. Arthur Smith Woodward on the other hand conducted further research on the continental remains and recognized that Owen's composite Megalania further contained the fossils of a marsupial in addition to the monitor lizard and turtle remains. Although he too agreed with Huxley's conclusion that the fossils were those of a turtle, both he and Boulenger pointed out that Meiolania took precedence over Ceratochelys and would thus be the correct name. He also concluded that the Queensland skull was clearly distinct from the material collected on Lord Howe Island and thus coined the name Meiolania oweni for the continental material in 1888.

Additional material was then described in 1889 from Gulgong, New South Wales, and in 1893 from Coolah, New South Wales. These instances were thought to correspond to a Pliocene and Pleistocene age respectively and recorded by Robert Etheridge, Junior. Etheridge initially intended to write a detailed description on Meiolania after becoming personally invested and ensuring the continued collection of material. However his focus eventually shifted and his work was instead continued by Charles Anderson. Around the same time the remains of a meiolaniid turtle were discovered in Argentina, named Niolamia argentina by Florentino Ameghino. While these remains were briefly considered to be a species of Meiolania and may have in fact originally intended to be named as a species of the genus, they would eventually found to be distinct enough to retain the original name.

=== Additional finds on Lord Howe Island ===
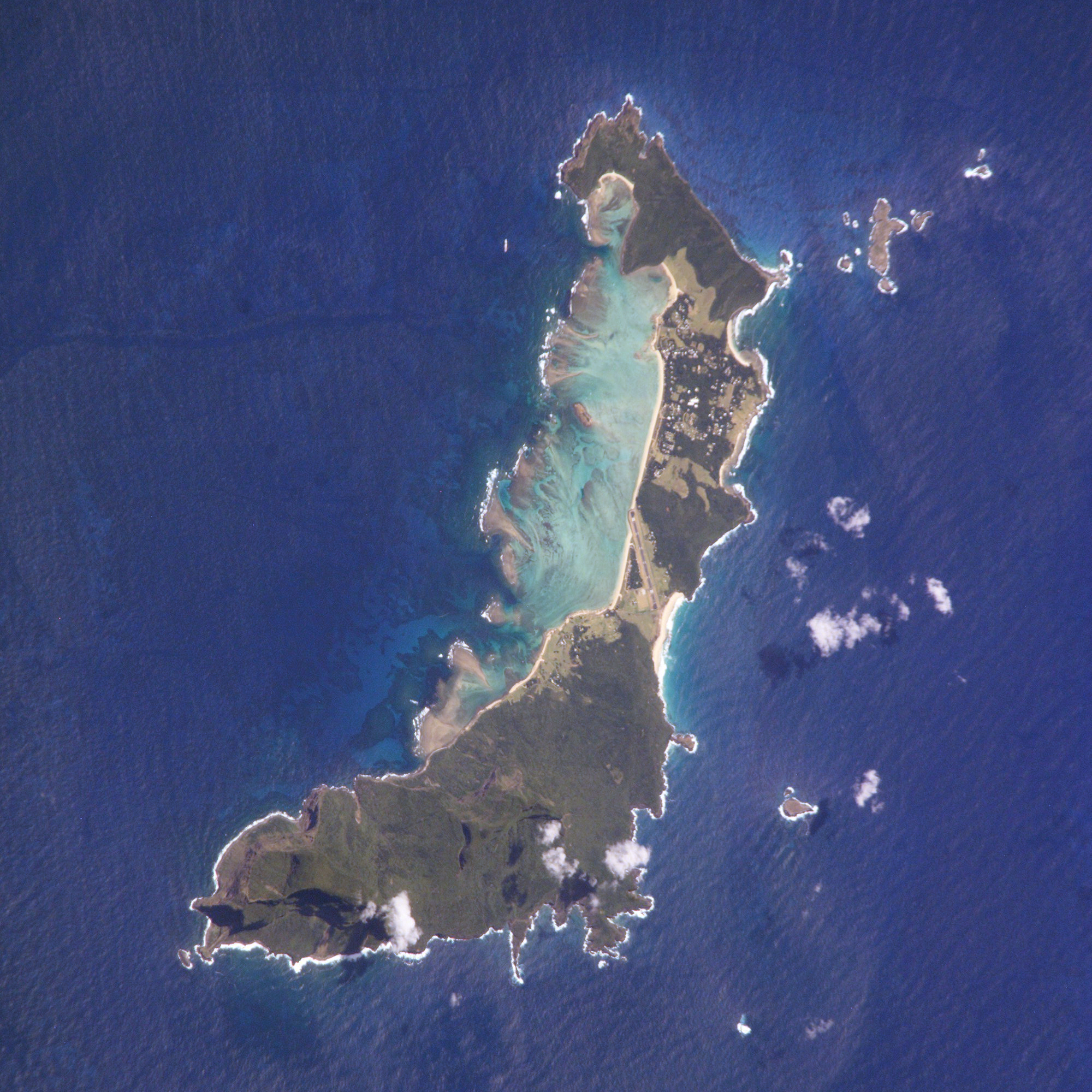
The majority of Meiolania remains were found on Lord Howe Island

Another important contributor in the research history of Meiolania was William Nichols, a local who served as a guide and collector for the Australian Museum. According to Gaffney, Nichols' contribution practically doubled the amount of known Meiolania specimens while also finding the first significant shell remains of this genus.

After a brief period of little to no new discoveries, Anderson's work with the turtle remains eventually lead to the creation of another species in 1925, when he described the horns and limb bones of a meiolaniid turtle discovered on Walpole Island south of New Caledonia. Originally these bones were discovered by A. C. Mackay, an engineer working for the Australian guano company. These remains were named Meiolania mackayi by Anderson, although later reviews of the material argued that the species was not diagnostic enough to have warranted this distinction. In addition to describing a new species, Anderson further supervised the creation of a skull reconstruction of Meiolania and described a great many remains collected towards the end of the 19th century on Lord Howe Island. With this Anderson finished the project started by Etheridge years prior. Anderson furthermore was the first to map the distribution of Meiolania across Lord Howe Island, even though the information was largely based on information given to him by Allan Riverstone McCulloch, as Anderson had not visited the island himself.

Parallel to Anderson publishing on the Etheridge collection, William Nichol's son-in-law Reginald V. Hines and a schoolteacher named Max Nicholls worked together to continue excavations, uncovering an additional 200 specimens, which they sold to the Australian Museum. Among the most important finds of theirs was a plastron and an articulated hindlimb, which dispelled Anderson's notion that Meiolania was a sea turtle. By the 1940s the locality where both Nichols' and Hine's had recovered their specimens became less relevant, with other areas across the island gaining importance. Among the most important finds from these new localities was a carapace with articulated vertebrae and limb bones, but no skull. The discovery, made at Ned's Beach in 1959, was made rather coincidentally following a joking challenge made by Elizabeth Carrington Pope to Ray Missen, a local meteorologist. While photos were taken during recovery, a collapse of the excavation area nearly destroyed the shell. Eggs were found soon thereafter and during the excavation of a pool the most complete skeleton to date was found. Although uncovered with the use of a jackhammer, the specimen could be pieced together and would eventually serve as the basis for later reconstructions of Meiolania.

The best known carapace of Meiolania was discovered in 1977, and much like the remains of Pope and Missen, had been an coincidental find. Alex Ritchie, who worked at the Australian Museum, failed to participate in the recovery of the "swimming pool" skeleton (as it is named by Gaffney). When he was informed of yet another find, he traveled to Lord Howe Island only to conclude that the remains were relatively insignificant. During his stay however he discovered the aforementioned shell and an associated skull on Old Settlement Beach.

=== Work by Gaffney and beyond ===
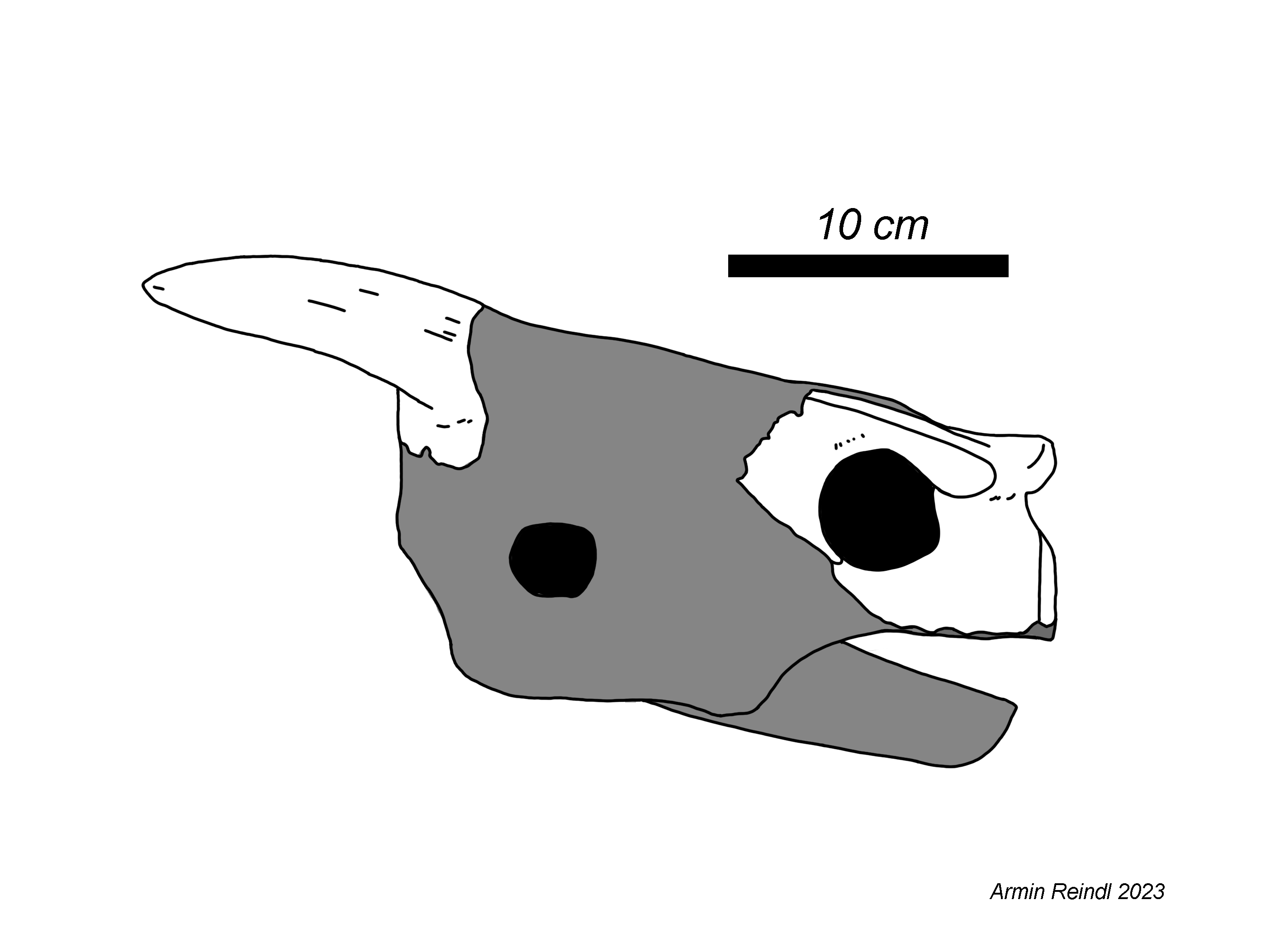
Meiolania brevicollis, named by Megirian in 1992

The next important expedition to Lord Howe Island would be a joint project between the Australian Museum and the American Museum of Natural History in 1980, with the latter returning two years prior for a second dig. These expeditions were the basis for a series of major publications by American researcher Eugene S. Gaffney, now considered to be an expert on meiolaniids. Gaffney's work consisted of complete and detailed descriptions of all known body parts of Meiolania and their significance for the phylogenetic position of the group. Gaffney published three papers on the subject: the first, dealing with the history of Meiolania's discovery and its skull, the second on the vertebrae and tail club, and the final publication covering the shell and limbs while also reviewing Meiolaniidae as a whole. These papers were published in 1983, 1985, and 1996, respectively.

In part due to Gaffney's work, meiolaniids had become much better understood by 1992. These advances in our understanding of Meiolania lead Gaffney to re-examine the material of M. oweni, finding that it was sufficiently distinct from all other species to warrant being placed in its own genus, Ninjemys. While this removed one species from the genus, another was added that same year when Dirk Megirian described Meiolania brevicollis based on Miocene remains from the Camfield Beds (Northern Territory) of mainland Australia. Megirian had previously mentioned the Camfield material in a brief report in 1989, but was at that time unable to identify it at a species level.

The most recently described species was published in 2010 by White and colleagues, based on limb material from Vanuatu. However, due to the fact that this species is not known from skulls and tail elements, it is uncertain if it actually represents a species of Meiolania and is thus typically referred to as ?Meiolania damelipi both by the original team and subsequent authors.

Although the taxonomy of this genus is still not fully clarified, especially with the abundance of isolated remains and species named from poor or possibly non-meiolaniid remains, papers from the 2010s and onward largely focussed on aspects of the animals paleobiology, aided by multiple papers reexamining the South American taxa. 2016 saw an analysis performed on an egg clutch assigned to Meiolania, in 2017 the braincase of Meiolania was studied illuminating some aspects of its lifestyle, and in 2019 Brown and Moll published an extensive review on the dispersal, ecology and lifestyle of the animal.

=== Etymology ===
The meaning of the name Meiolania has been subject to some debate, as Owen didn't offer a detailed etymology in the type description. This has led to two primary hypotheses, both agreeing that the name has the same origin as that of Megalania and that the first element of the name derives from the Ancient Greek "meion" meaning "lesser". The origin of the second part is however less conclusive. Gaffney argues that the suffix derives from the Latin word "lanius", which means "butcher". In this way Meiolania ("lesser butcher") would be complementary to Megalania ("great butcher"). Following Juliana Sterli and colleagues meanwhile the name should translate to "lesser roamer" from the Ancient Greek "ήλaίνω" meaning "to roam about". This argument is supported by the work of Richard Owen himself. Although Owen never gave an etymology for Meiolania, he did provide one for Megalania. Contrary to Gaffney's writing, Owen translates Megalania as "great roamer" rather than "great butcher".

== Species ==
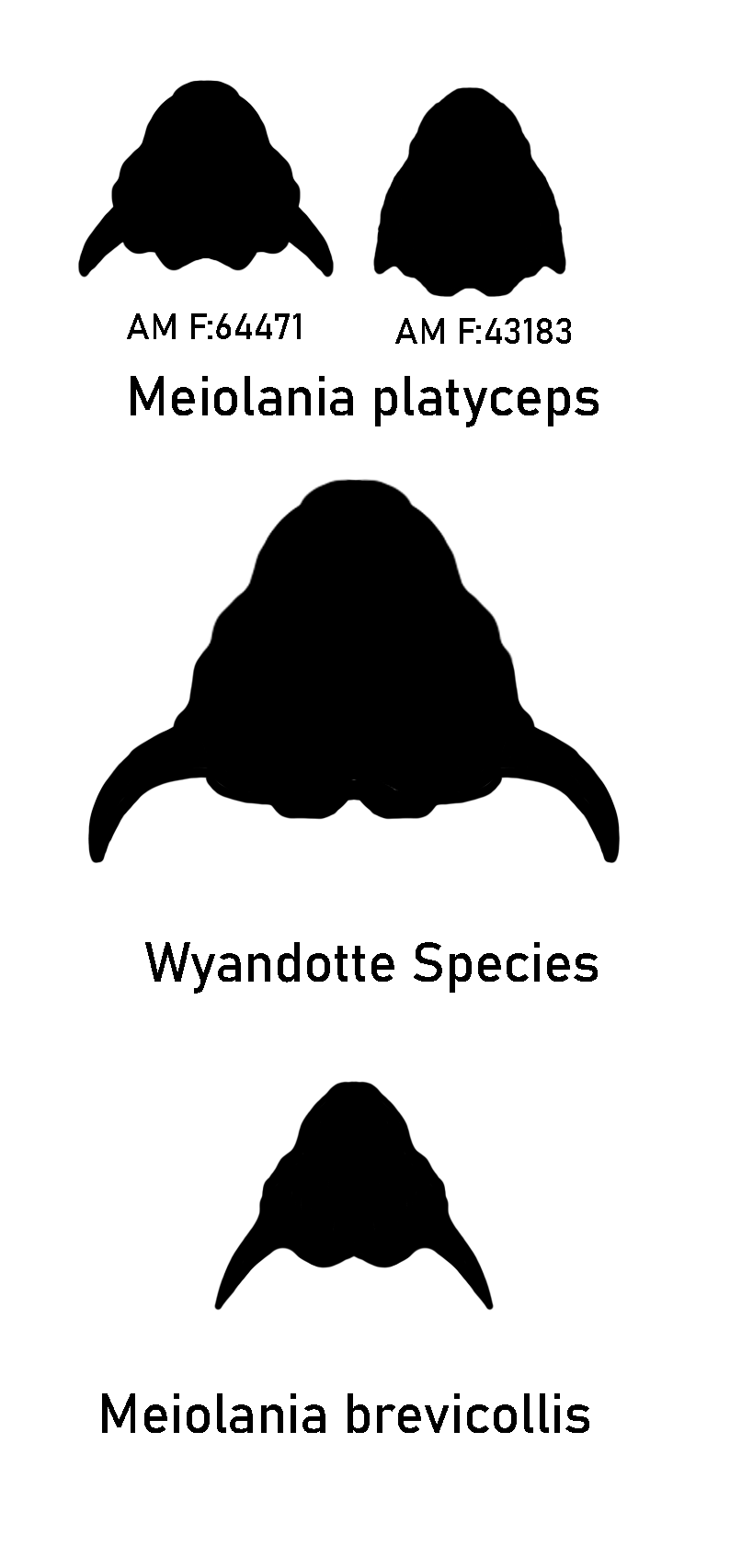
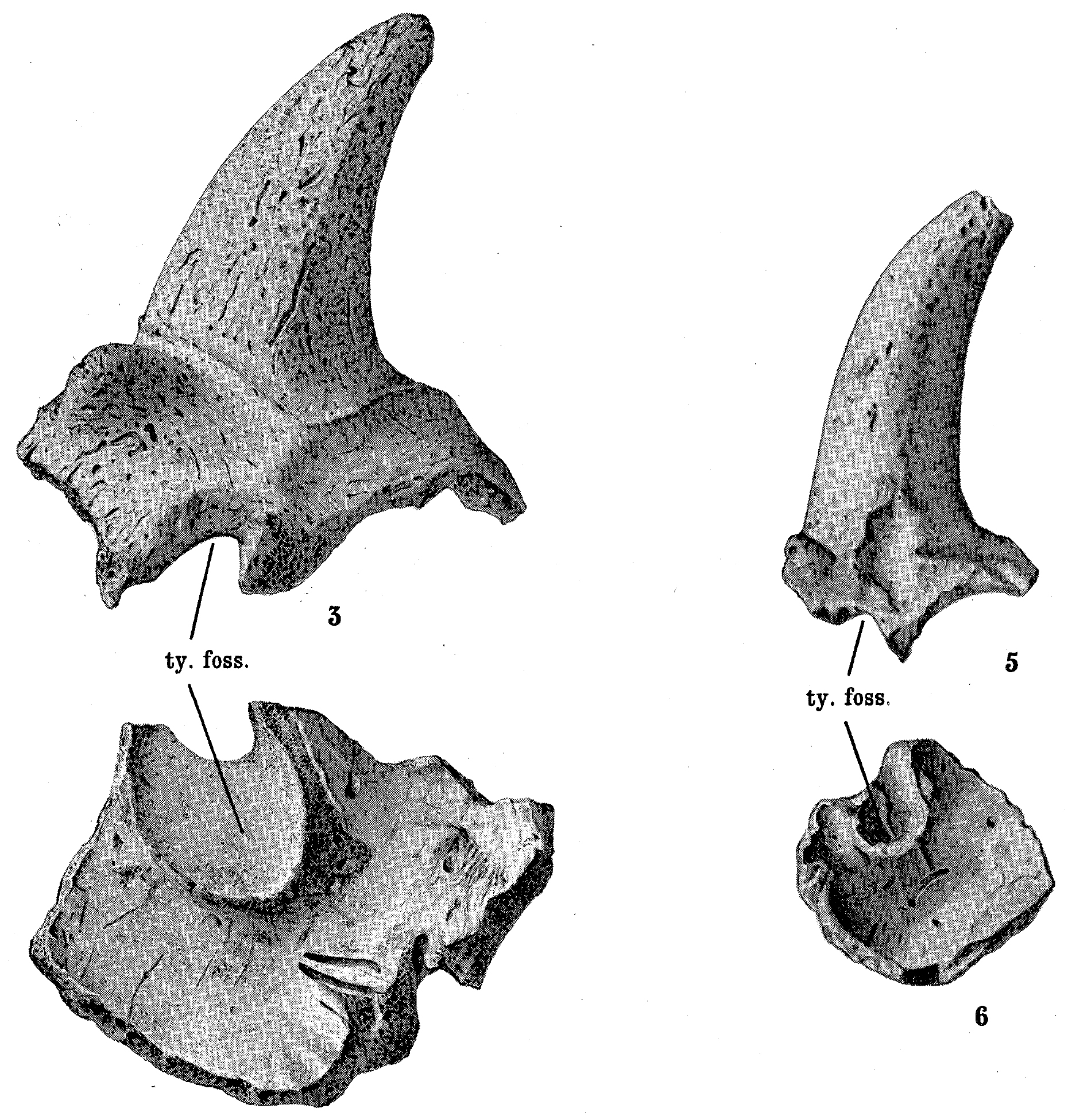
The cranial ornamentation of Meiolania can vary greatly between and within species (top image). M. mackayi (bottom image, right) likely falls within the intraspecific variation of M. platyceps.
- M. brevicollis

While most species of Meiolania were recovered from islands, M. brevicollis is the only named species from mainland Australia. Its fossils were discovered at the "Blast Site" near Camfield Station in the Northern Territory. It is thought to be a part of the Bullock Creek Local Fauna, dating to the middle to late Miocene and thus making it the oldest named Meiolania species. M. brevicollis is among the better known Meiolania species and known from partial skulls, neck vertebrae, horn cores, osteoderms, and shell remains. While this is not as much as is known for the type species, it still allows for comparison beyond the size and shape of the horns. The species name brevicollis was chosen in reference to the neck, which is shorter than that of M. platyceps.

- ?M. damelipi

The fossils of ?Meiolania damelipi could represent the youngest record of the genus and meiolaniids as a whole, as they were discovered at the archaeological site of Teouma on Efate, Vanuatu. These bones date to 2,890 to 2,760 BP (ca. 940–810 BC) and were found alongside those of sea turtles. Although the remains of ?M. damelipi are numerous, accounting for 405 bones, their assignment to Meiolania is uncertain as critical components such as tail rings, extensive carapace remains and most importantly skulls and horn cores are absent from the site. Due to this ?M. damelipi (named for Willie Damelip) is only tentatively assigned to Meiolania and could in fact represent a different terrestrial turtle. Later excavations have revealed additional bones, but still failed to recover horn cores. It has also been noted that ?M. damelipi bears resemblance to fossil turtles from Fiji.

- M. mackayi

Known from the Pleistocene of Walpole Island, M. mackayi is known primarily from isolated horn core remains as well as a few limb bones. This species generally resembles M. platyceps, but was described as having narrower horns and more gracile limbs. However, according to Gaffney the fossil remains are not adequate enough to support a new species. While Gaffney concedes that it could represent a distinct biological species due to the isolation of Walpole Island, it does not show many physical differences from the better known species. This is followed by Sterli, who reasons that the two populations could have become genetically distinct due to being unable to maintain gene flow over such a large distance. However as the material had already been named, Gaffney retained the species in his 1996 review as the name has some value in making discussion easier. It was named after A. C. Mackay, an engineer who discovered the first fossils.

- M. platyceps

The type species of the genus, M. platyceps is also the best known of the recognized species and is represented by several hundred individual bones as well as a few articulated skeletons. While the extensive number of fossil remains establishes M. platyceps as the de facto species used in comparison with other turtle groups, it also serves to highlight the shortcomings of the less complete species, as M. platyceps specimens show a great range of intraspecific variation. Meiolania platyceps was endemic to Lord Howe Island, the remnant of a former volcano located between Australia and New Zealand and lived during the Pleistocene. Meiolania platyceps also includes specimens previously named Meiolania minor by Owen.

- Wyandotte Species

A large bodied Meiolania from Wyandotte Creek on Australia's mainland. The bones of the Wyandotte species were recovered from the Late Pleistocene (45,000 and 200,000 BP) of northern Queensland, with a potential second locality from Darling Downs. As the material of this "species" only consists of isolated horn cores and tail vertebrae, it has not been named and simply referred to by the name of the locality it was found at. Gaffney cautions against establishing species based on variable features such as horn cores and tentatively assigns the Wyandotte remains to Meiolania cf. platyceps. Gaffney does however still note the great size of the animal, its unique geography compared to other Pleistocene Meiolania species and the fact that the horns do not fully match those of the other established species.

Other indeterminate Meiolania or meiolaniid fossils have been found across several South Pacific islands including Tiga Island, the Pindai Caves of Grande Terre and Viti Levu (Fiji). While these occurrences are sometimes listed as examples of Meiolania, they are too fragmentary to properly assign to the genus properly and are listed as indeterminate meiolaniids by Gaffney. This highlights one particular issue with the fossil record of Meiolania, the lack of material. Although M. platyceps is known from a large amount of material and M. brevicollis can be morphologically distinguished from it, other members of the genus are mostly known from isolated remains and separated largely on body size, horn thickness and geography. This renders M. platyceps and M. brevicollis the only well understood Meiolania species, with the others being possible synonyms or not even belonging to Meiolania at all.

== Description ==
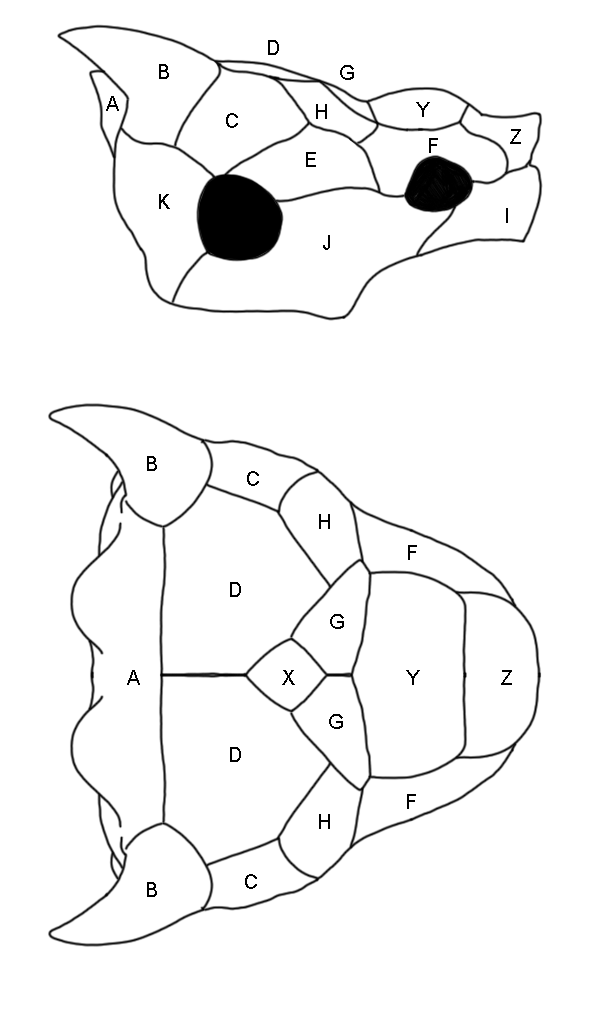
Scale areas of Meiolania platyceps, based on AM F:61110

=== Skull and horns ===
The skull of Meiolania is robust with a rounded snout and a series of horns ornamenting the back. The nasal bones are fused into a single element that protrudes from the skull, though how far is subject to variation. In some specimens it is the front-most part of the skull, while in others the premaxilla extends further. The nares are divided into two by a bony internarial septum, a rarity among turtles. This appears to be a derived trait evolved by the lineage leading up to Meiolania. Basal meiolaniids only feature a single narial opening, while those of Ninjemys are only partially divided. Meiolania platyceps specimens show both states, with some possessing partially and others fully divided nares. This can be attributed either to individual variation or to different growth stages of this part of the skull specifically. It is however not consistent with being overall indicative of age, as the difference in size between these specimens does not line up with the hypothesis. The tympanic cavity of Meiolania is large, comparable to that of modern testudinids. The triturating surface of the maxilla, used to grind and chew, shows a distinct second accessory ridge that is not present in more basal taxa like Niolamia and Ninjemys. The best known skull besides the type species is that of M. brevicollis. Although it overall resembles the more recent form, the head of this species appears to have been flatter with more elongated eye sockets. Furthermore, the cheeks behind the eyes are flat in M. brevicollis and there is a small postorbital crest behind the eyes.

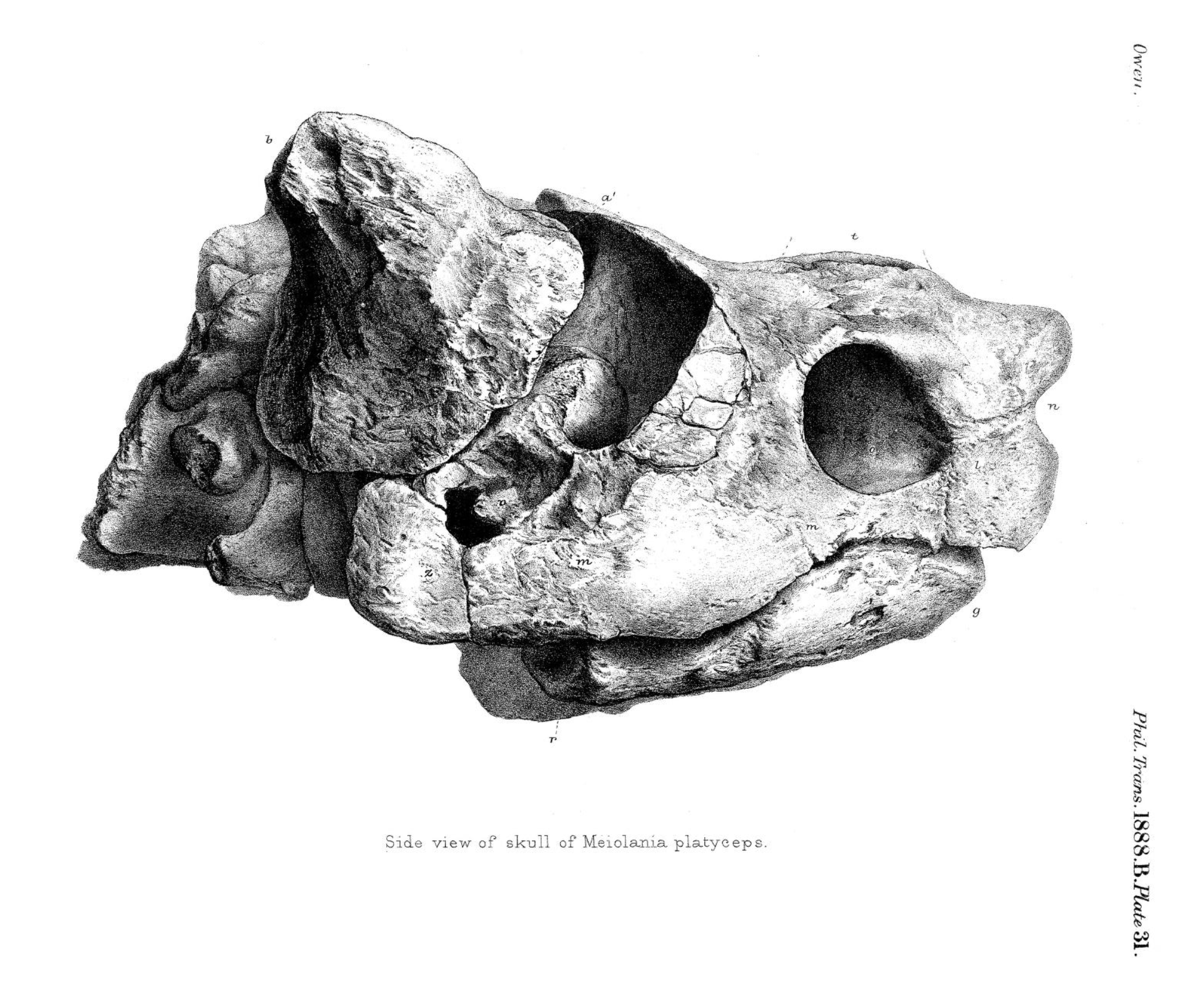
Skull of Meiolania platyceps, figured in 1888

Like other meiolaniids, Meiolania is easily identifyable by the size and shape of the various scale areas. In the absence of many of the actual bone sutures, it is the margins of these scales that are used to diagnose meiolaniid turtles. The areas are referred to as scales, scutes, scale areas or horns should they feature prominent protuberances. The C scales are highly variable convex scutes located right above the tympanic cavity. In some individuals it is simply a rounded area, while in others it features a notable elevation. In the most extreme cases the C scales can form horns similar to the more consistently prominent B scales, also referred to as horns or horn cores. It is these B horns that are most characteristic for Meiolania, being typically large elements with a resemblance to the horns of a cow. The size of these horns is variable among the different species and even among individuals of a single form. In Meiolania platyceps the B scales range from being fully formed horns to being no bigger than the preceding C scale. These stark differences within a single species are however not related to sexual dimorphism. A study comparing 50 horn cores of M. platyceps found that there is no evidence for bimodality, which means the distribution in horn size is more complex than simply being split between short-horned and long-horned individuals. Instead the results skew towards the long-horned form. Among the different species, the horn cores of M. brevicollis are the narrowest, followed by those of M. mackayi, whose upper limit overlaps with those of the more robust Wyandotte species and M. platyceps. The B horns of the Wyandotte species show some of the strongest curvature among the species and are also among the longest proportionally. At least in relative length the narrow horns of M. brevicollis manage to rival those of the Wyandotte species. The angle at which these horns project may also differ between species, as those of M. brevicollis emerge at a notably lower angle than those of M. platyceps. Regardless of these potential interspecific differences, they are very much unlike the sideways projecting horns of Ninjemys and Niolamia or the small ridge of hornlets seen in Warkalania. Additionally, while in these taxa the A, B and C scale areas form a single continuous shelf at the back of the head, this is not the case in Meiolania. The A scale area, which overlays the rear-most surface of the skull, forms only relatively small horns differing greatly from the massive, shield-like structure seen in Ninjemys and Niolamia. This is most noticeable in M. brevicollis, in which the A horns are practically vestigial.

The scale areas of Meiolania are described as consistently showing at least slightly raised centers, so while they may not all form horns they are thicker in the middle than towards the edges. The X scale, which is a singular scale in the center of the skull roof, is small and rhomboid in shape. Furthermore, it is concave, meaning it forms somewhat of an indentation in the skull in profile view. While this scale projects in-between the D and G scales, it does not prevent either of those pairs from contacting each other along the midline. Although the D scales have been described as slightly convex, said convexity is only poorly developed compared to other meiolaniids and thus appears much lower, setting Meiolania apart from Ninjemys and Niolamia. The G scales are much smaller and almost fully separated by the X scale. Like the D scales, they are not especially convex and appear flat. The Y and Z scales, covering the front-most areas of the skull from between the eyes to the tip of the snout, are both large and unpaired. Scale Z is the more anterior of the two, covering the very tip of Meiolania's snout and the nasal area. Although the margins between the Z and Y scale are raised, towards the bottom of the jaw where the Z scale connects to the F scales this ridge becomes a trough. Scale Y meanwhile covers much of the area between the two eyesockets and is larger than scale Z. This scale features a very prominent convexity, meaning it bulges out giving it a somewhat domed appearance. Although the Y scale is also slightly raised in Ninjemys, it is not as extreme as in Meiolania.

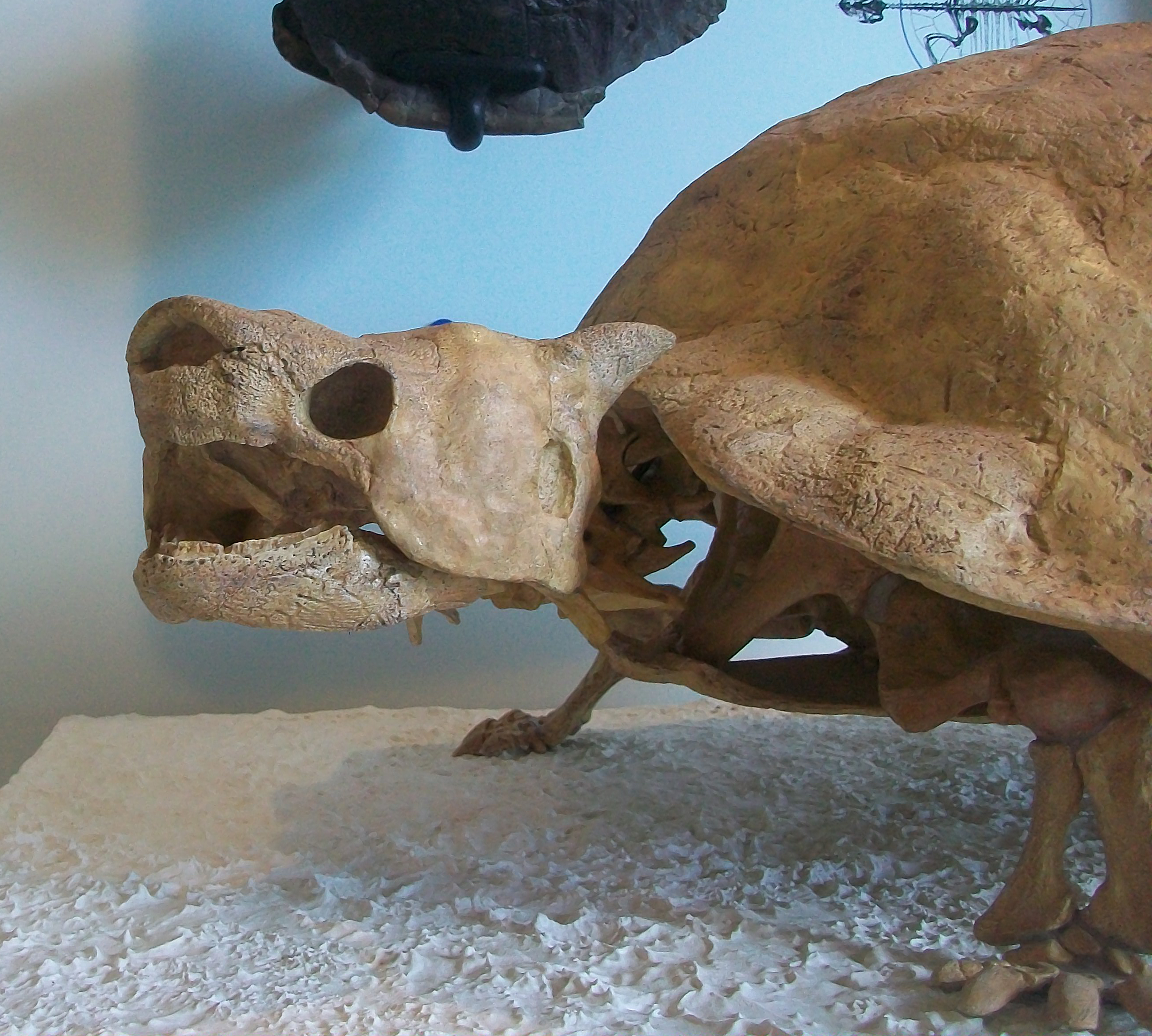
Meiolania platyceps AMNH 29076 skull cast

The F scales cover the entire area between the eyesockets and the dorsal Y and Z scutes, which effectively amounts to half of the area surrounding each eye. They meet the H scales towards the back of the skull. The H scales are somewhat shaped like a pentagon and cover both the sides as well as the top of the skull. Scute K is the posterior-most scale on the side of the skull, covering the area behind the tympanic cavity. Some individuals feature a prominent convexity in this region. Below the tympanic cavity the K scale area meets the J scale area, with the two only being separated by a shallow trough. It is not entirely clear how this might affect the soft tissue of the skull. On the one hand, this shallow, poorly defined contact may indicate that these two areas were not covered by scales but by skin as in many modern turtles (the same would also have to apply to Ninjemys). The prominent boss on the K scale area of some other individuals meanwhile favors the interpretation that the covering would have primarily consisted of scales like the remainder of the skull. Scale E is a minor element located between the tympanic cavity and the eyesockets, while scale I covers the area that effectively forms the beak. Scale area I is presumably covered in an extension of the rhamphotheca which also covers the chewing surface of the jaws. It is thought that the rhamphotheca extends approximately until the connection between scales I and J.

=== Postcrania ===
==== Limbs ====
The shoulder girdle is typically chelonian, showing the three prongs formed by the scapula and coracoid also seen in other turtles. As with most of Meiolania's anatomy, the shoulder girdle is more robust than in most turtles, bearing similarity to terrestrial tortoises. The dorsal process of the shoulder blade is nearly cylindrical, ending in a rounded surface that articulates with the shell. The second process of the shoulder blade, known as the acromial process, diverges from the dorsal process at a 120° angle. The angle between these two processes has been used as an indicator for shell depth, as it joins at a right angle of 90° in the shallow-shelled aquatic turtles and at more obtuse angles in high-shelled turtles like tortoises and snapping turtles. This is confirmed in Meiolania when examining the shell remains themselves. The final of the three processes of the shoulder blade is formed by the coracoid, which is a short and fan-shaped element like in tortoises.

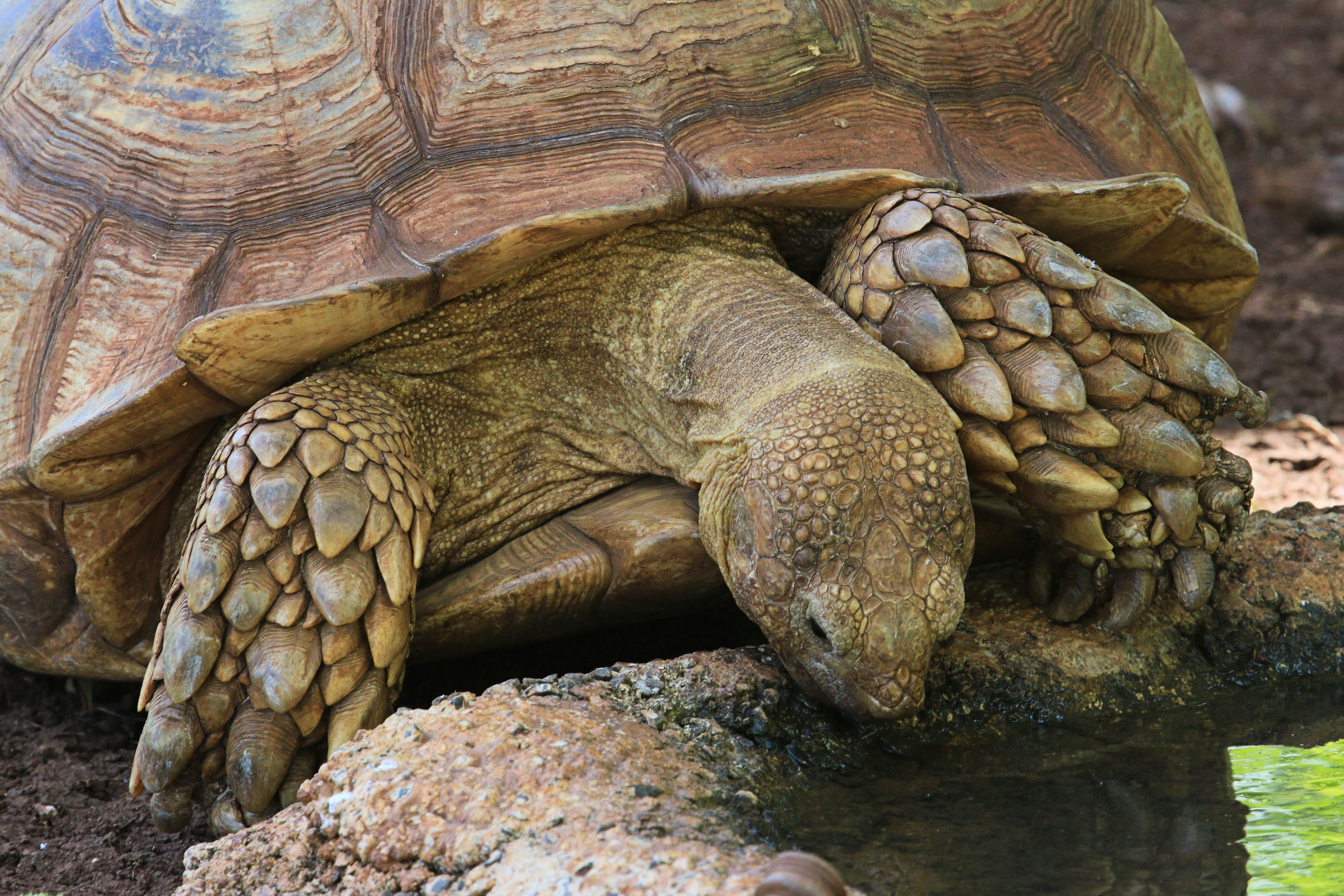
The limbs of Meiolania are thought to have been covered in plate and cone-shaped osteoderms, similar to the armor seen on some modern tortoises.

There is no complete hip for Meiolania, but numerous partial remains have been found. The ilium extends nearly straight from the hip joint and takes on a spool-shape, both characters seen in snapping turtles and tortoises as well. Where Meiolania diverges from the typical bauplan is in how the ilium ends. Among cryptodires, the ilium either fans out (as in baenids) or curves back (as in most testudinoids and snapping turtles). The fact that the ilium is mostly straight like in testudinids might hint at yet another trait related to lifestyle rather than phylogeny. The ischium possesses well developed lateral processes and the contact between this bone and the lower half of the shell (the plastron) extends to the midline of the hip. The area where ischium and pubis meet is massive and forms a large plate of bone that has thyroid fenestrae, something typically considered to be a basal condition for turtles that was lost and redeveloped across the clade. The pubis also forms multiple processes, two lateral processes that connect to the plastron and a single ossified epipubis that extends about as far as the lateral processes.

The front limbs of Meiolania were short and stout, especially in M. platyceps, resembling those of terrestrial tortoises and thus disspelling early notions researchers had about Meiolania being marine. Humerus bones are well sampled and consequently, a lot of variation is present. For instance, some are noted by Gaffney for being unusually rugose in their surface texture. The carpal bones consist of seven elements, three proximal bones articulating with the radius and ulna while the remaining four connect to the fingers. The presence of three proximal carpals stands out, as most other turtles have four proximal carpals instead. While at least some modern species also possess three, this is due to two of them having been fused, creating a single elongated bone. This does not appear to be the case in Meiolania and it is instead hypothesized that the missing bone was either simply absent or consisted purely of cartilage, preventing it from fossilizing along the others. Something similar could be the case with the distal carpal bones, which like the proximal ones lack one bone compared to other turtles. Five fingers were present on each of Meiolanias forelimbs. The first finger was short and wide, followed by three fingers of roughly equal length and a fifth, shortened finger. Each finger is tipped by blunt and flat unguals resembling those of gopher tortoises, rather than the narrow and curved claws seen in terrapins and snapping turtles. The limbs of ?Meiolania damelipi meanwhile were described as being relatively more gracile.

The femur shows the same overall traits as the humerus, with a great amount of variability between specimens, especially in rugosity and ossification of the articular surface edge. It is a stout element, matching the robust build of Meiolania and broadly resembling those of cryptodire turtles. The femoral head is very much rounded like that of tortoises, rather than elongated, yet another feature associated with terrestrial locomotion or at least bottom walking rather than swimming. Like the femur, the tibia and fibula are stout, robust bones, even more so than in those of other terrestrial turtles. As in other turtles, the astragalus and calcaneum are fused into a single element simply referred to as the astragalocalcaneum. However, where the two bones can still be differentiated in most other turtles based on the presence of a suture zone, in Meiolania no such distinction can be made as they are completely fused to one another. The distal tarsal bones are only poorly known, although it is assumed that Meiolania possessed the same amount as modern turtles. Meiolania had four toes with similar proportions as the fingers, meaning they were short with broad, flattened and uncurved unguals.

Osteoderms or dermal ossifications are known from both M. platyceps and M. brevicollis and are clearly different from those of crocodilians. Three types can be distinguished. The first is a smooth sesamoid bone embedded in the flexor tendon musculature of the third finger, facing the ground. The second type correlates to more traditional protective osteoderms and can be found in the form of disc and cone-shaped bones that likely covered the limbs in a manner similar to the dermal ossicles of modern tortoises. Similar structures are common in modern turtles and are partially exposed with scales covering the outer surface. The third type is a porous and rough-surfaced ossification of unclear function found near the toes. Unlike the exposed cone-like osteoderms, this third type was likely fully embedded into the skin of the turtle.

==== Neck ====
The neck vertebrae are known from two species: M. platyceps and M. brevicollis. The former had vertebrae that were longer, wider and lower while those of the later were shorter, narrower and taller. The neural spine of the axis is short in M. platyceps and high in M. brevicollis. Furthermore, the underside of the 5th and 6th cervicals possessed a keel in M. brevicollis which is missing in the Lord Howe Island species. This essentially means that M. platyceps had a neck notably longer than that of M. brevicollis. One of the most distinctive features of the neck vertebrae of Meiolania is the presence of well-developed cervical ribs. This stands out as they are absent in nearly all other turtles. Meiolania has at least five pairs of free cervical ribs, a possibly fused sixth pair and what may be a small rib element of the atlas. The first well-developed rib belongs to the second cervical and is, together with the third and fourth, among the largest of the cervical ribs.

==== Tail and tail club ====
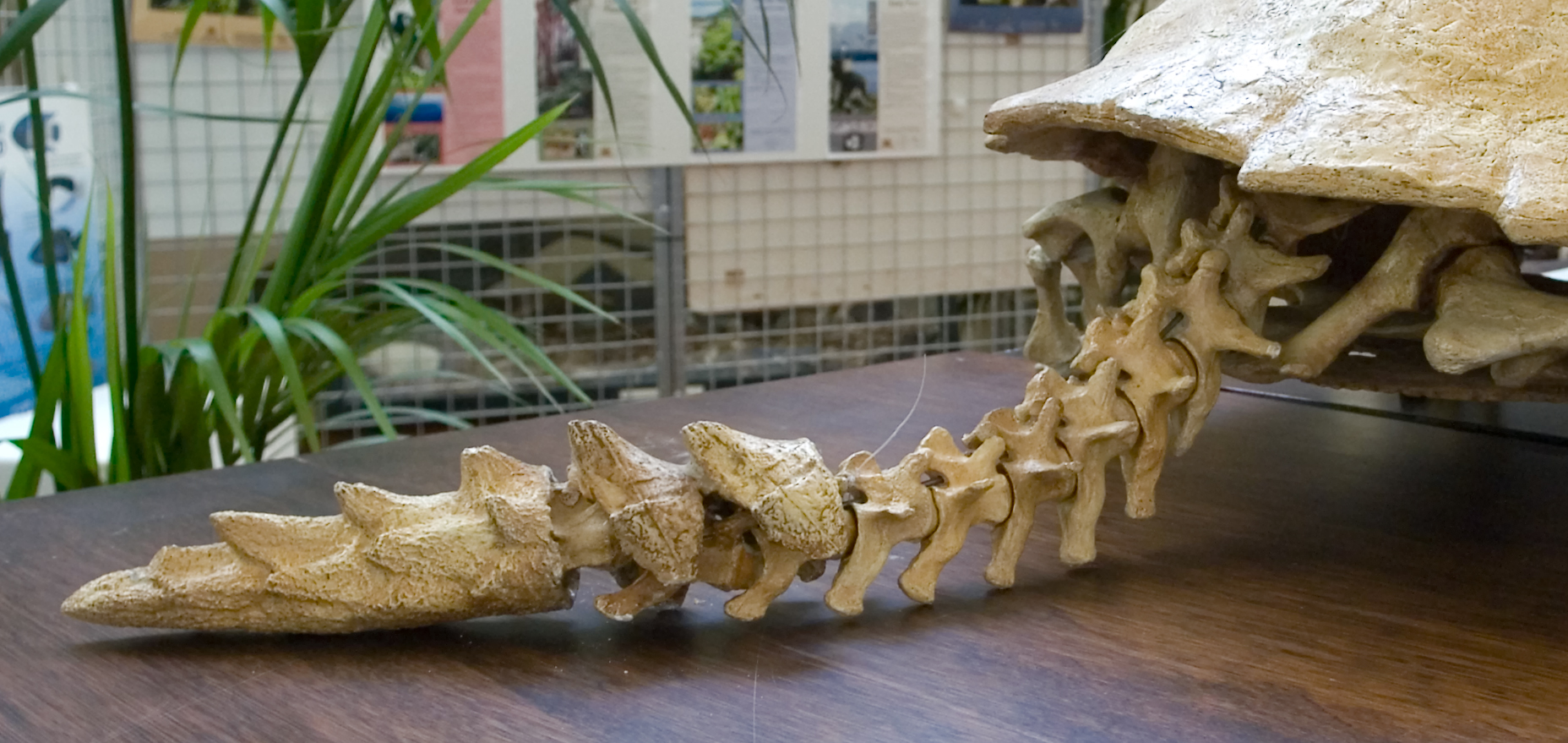
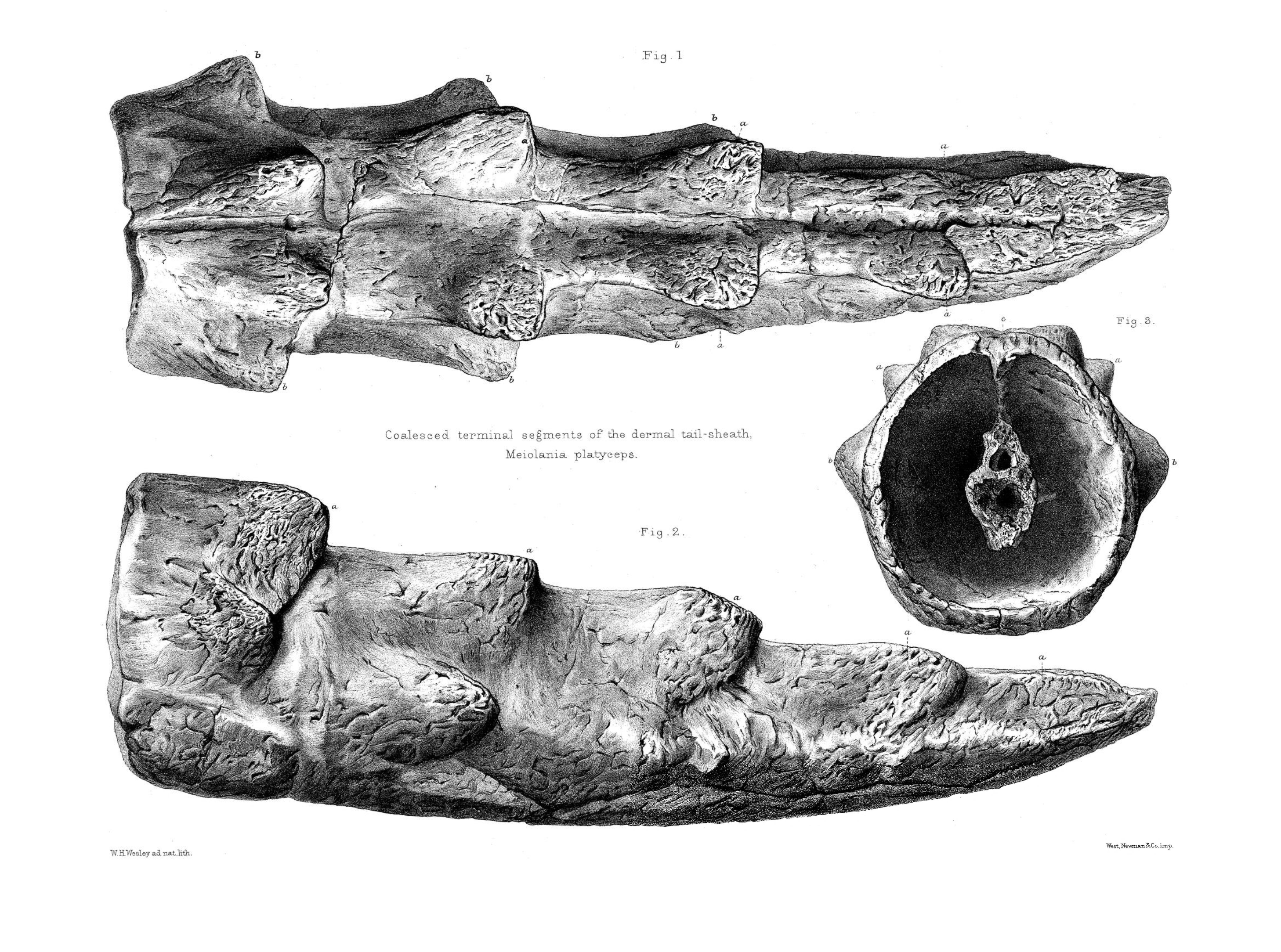
The tail club of Meiolania platyceps

As no fully articulated tails are available, it is not known how many vertebrae formed the caudal series. Gaffney suggests that a minimum of 10 vertebrae formed the tail based on comparison with modern turtles. It is possible that there were more, but unlikely for there to have been fewer. Following this interpretation, the tail of Meiolania would have been proportionally long, similar to those of modern snapping turtles. The tail of Meiolania was protected by a series of armored rings. These rings do not fully enclose the tail around its circumference, as the bottom of the segment is open and the ring thus incomplete. This is different from the rings in more basal species, in which the rings are closed. Based on specimen AMF:9051 these rings articulated with one another and correspond directly with the vertebrae, meaning each ring surrounds a single tail vertebra. It is unclear exactly how much of the tail was covered by rings. The best preserved fossils primarily show those towards the end of the tail, however, Gaffney proposes that the entire length would have been covered. Evidence to support Gaffney's claim can be found in some isolated material initially described as a "sternal arch" by Owen. Based on this fossil the rings begin as much wider elements, corresponding with a broader tail closer to the torso. These earlier rings are comparably thin and do not immediately articulate with one another, meaning they don't overlap as the posterior ones do. Along the length of the tail, two pairs or ridges situated on the surface of the rings gradually grow and form two distinct pairs of thornlike spikes towards the tails end. The larger pair is placed atop the rings and curves up and backwards, while the second pair projects from the side of the rings and is notably smaller.

The final segment of the tail is covered by what is generally called a tail club or tail sheath, superficially resembling those seen in certain species of glyptodonts and ankylosaurid dinosaurs. This club consists of four spiked segments similar to the rings and the conical tip of the tail. It is not entirely clear whether or not the club is derived from the tail rings or not. While the overall structure appears similar, with the fused club showing the same spike arrangement, one individual shows sutures that do not fit this interpretation. However it is also possible that said specimen is an outlier that does not represent how the club is typically formed. Unlike the preceding rings, the fused club surrounds the entirety of the vertebrae, lacking the ventral opening seen before. The surface of the club is covered in a multitude of pits and foramina that give it a rugose texture and likely served as pathways for nutrient vessels, indicating that the club itself was covered in a cornified layer of scales. The spikes of the club show a much greater level of variability compared to those on the rings prior. Although still appearing in the form of a dorsolateral and a lateral pair, both of which taper to form backwards-directed points, some Meiolania specimen preserve spikes on their club that are much blunter. The distance between the spikes can vary and even the size progression is subject to intraspecific variation, as typically the spikes of the club peak at the beginning of the club and grow gradually smaller, while in other individuals the spikes reach their greatest size around the second pair. There are signs of abrasion in some fossils, indicating that the bottom layer of scales on the club was gradually damaged by the animal dragging its tail over the ground. The tip of the club consists of nearly solid bone, with the final vertebra being barely separated from the surrounding ring. The tip of the club, like the spikes, may be pointed or blunt depending on the specimen.

==== Shell ====
The shell of Meiolania is roughly ovoid with parallel edges and a protruding front. It lacks the cephalic notch, an indentation in the front of the shell, as well as the caudal notch towards the back of it. The very back of the carapace is serrated, with the scutes forming a spiked edge. There are however questions regarding the precise shape of the carapace that aren't fully resolved. The most complete specimens all preserve it as flattened, but also clearly suffered from distortion and collapse of the shell during the fossilisation process, thus not reflecting its form in life. Analysis of individual shell elements all indicate at least some degree of vaulting. This indicates that the overall shape of the carapace is raised or arched, however, probably not nearly as pronounced as the vaulting seen in modern giant tortoises. Instead, the shell of Meiolania is thought to have resembled the shape seen in species of the gopher tortoise.

=== Size estimates ===
Size estimates differ between all recognized species. M. mackayi was among the smaller species, 30% smaller than M. platyceps, which in turn was 10 to 20% smaller than M. brevicollis and only half the size of the Wyandotte species. Put into numbers, M. mackayi is considered to have reached a carapace length of approximately 0.7 m (2 ft 4 in) and M. platyceps was estimated to reach a carapace length of 1 m (3 ft 3 in). Rhodin notes that the largest complete M. platyceps carapace measures 63.5 cm (25.0 in), and that the size of larger specimens was estimated based on the proportions of this individual. Another method used to determine the size of Meiolania was to compare the size of fossil eggs with those of modern tortoises. Based on this method, Lawver and Jackson estimated that one individual M. platyceps responsible for a clutch of 10 eggs must have had a carapace length of around 75 cm (30 in). Furthermore, some sources claim that Meiolania platyceps could reach lengths of more than 3 m (9.8 ft) including the tail, neck and head. The Wyandotte species stands out as the largest member of Meiolania, with the horn cores indicating an animal similar in size to Ninjemys and a carapace length of perhaps up to 2 m (6 ft 7 in). ?M. damelipi was described as being of a similar size to M. platyceps, with Rhodin and colleagues estimating a length of 1.35 m (4 ft 5 in) based on limb material.

Meiolania Size Estimates
| Species | Carapace length |
|---|---|
| M. brevicollis | 10-20% larger than M. platyceps |
| ?M. damelipi | 1.35 m (4.4 ft) |
| M. mackayi | 0.7 m (2.3 ft) |
| M. platyceps | 0.63–1 m (2.1–3.3 ft) |
| Wyandotte species | 2 m (6.6 ft) |

== Phylogeny ==
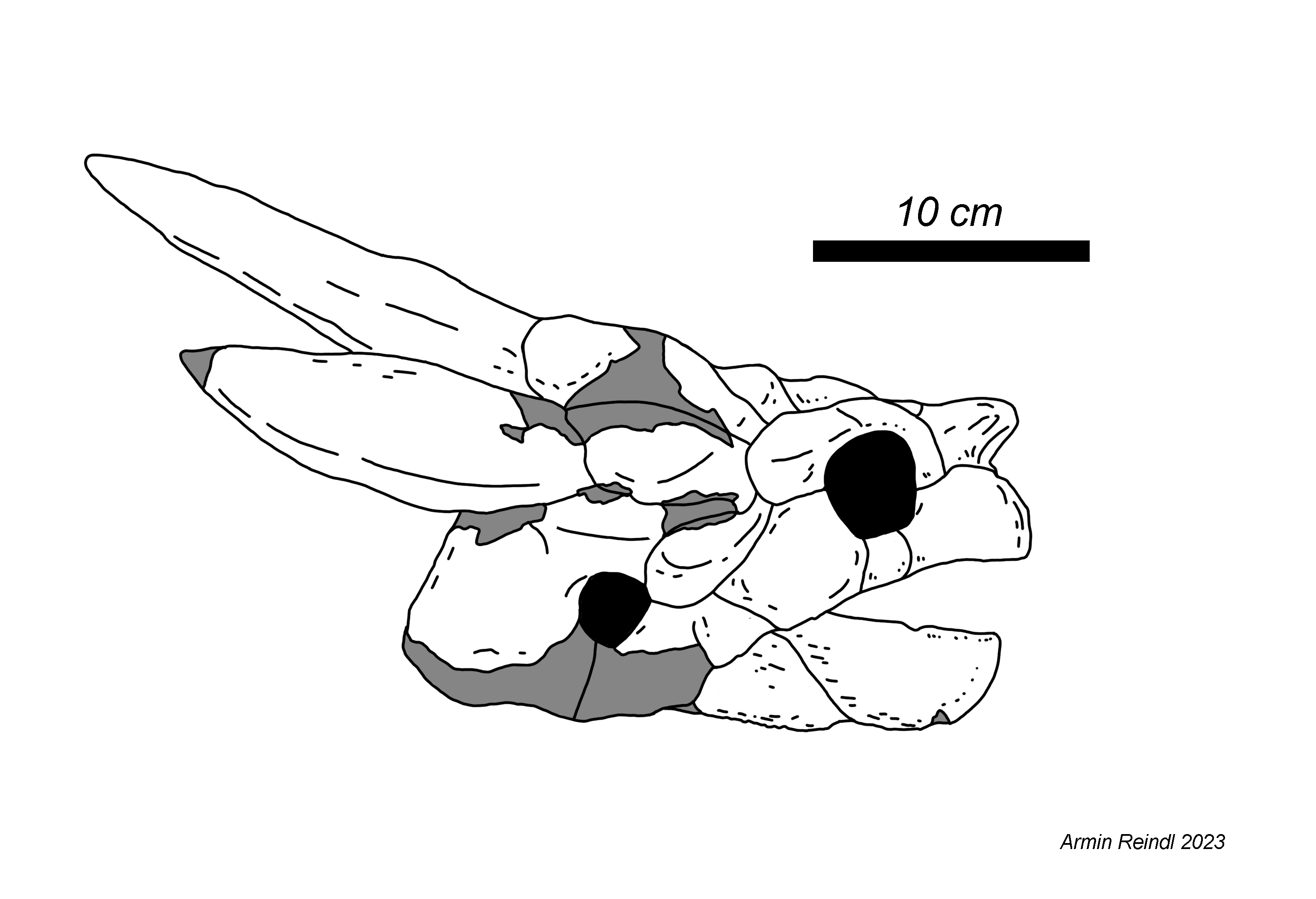
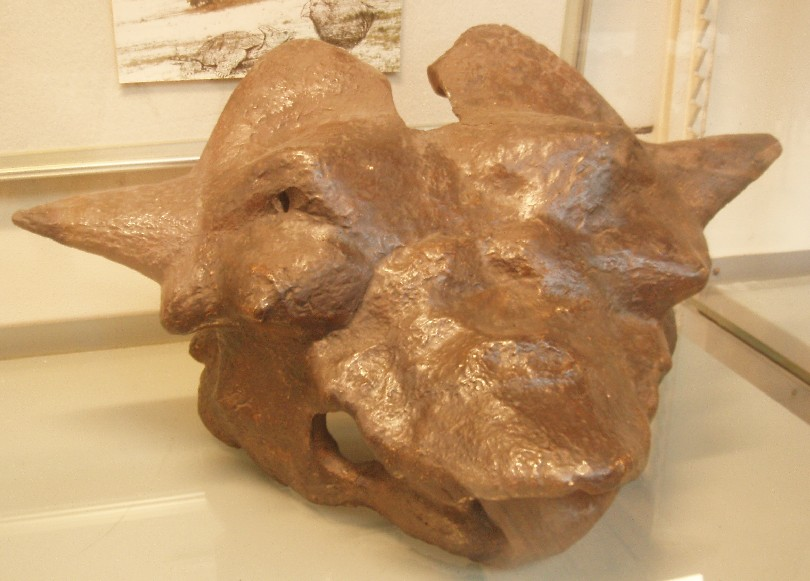
Niolamia (top) and Ninjemys (bottom) are the best known relatives of Meiolania.

Unlike the relationship between meiolaniids and other turtles, the internal structure of Meiolaniidae is well understood with research consistently recovering the same results. Within its family, Meiolania is placed as one of the most derived members, displaying several features that are observed to have changed between the earliest meiolaniids and Meiolania itself. The second accessory chewing surface, divided nares and small X scale first appeared at the beginning of the Australasian group that unites all meiolaniids other than Niolamia. Furthermore, Ninjemys is excluded from the clade formed by Warkalania and Meiolania in part based on the anatomy of the D scales, which is high in the former and low in the latter. Finally, the recovered cow-like horns and absence of a continuous shelf of scales at the back of the skull separates Meiolania from its closest relative, Warkalania. Throughout this family tree, one can also observe a gradual decrease in the size of the A scales, which begin as a large shield-like structure in basal taxa like Niolamia and Ninjemys and are comparably reduced in Meiolania. The B horns change orientation, protruding sideways in early forms and curving back in later species, however here Warkalania represents an outlier with its highly reduced horns. One wildcard is represented through Gaffneylania, the most recently described meiolaniid, as it was recovered in several different positions within the family. However this is largely due to its very fragmentary nature that leaves several important traits ambiguous.

Within the species Meiolania things are less certain, primarily due to how fragmentary or even undiagnostic some species are. It is hypothetically possible to find clades within the genus based on the width of the B horns, however as Gaffney notes this is not a consistent feature and varies greatly once one is met with a greater sample size.

- Meiolaniidae
  - Niolamia
  - - Ninjemys
    - - Warkalania
      - - Meiolania platyceps
        - - Meiolania mackayi
          - - Wyandotte species
            - Meiolania brevicollis

- - Crown Testudines
  - Meiolaniformes
    - Chubutemys copelloi
    - - - Mongolochelys efremovi
        - Peligrochelys walshae
      - - - Otwayemys cunicularius
          - Kallokibotion bajazidi
        - Meiolaniidae
          - Niolamia argentina
          - Gaffneylania auricularis ?
          - - Ninjemys oweni
            - Gaffneylania auricularis ?
            - - Warkalania carinaminor
              - Gaffneylania auricularis ?
              - Meiolania platyceps

== Paleobiogeography ==
While the geographic range of early meiolaniids and the continental Meiolania brevicollis are easily explained through the breakup of Gondwana, other means of dispersal must have been necessary to account for the many remains found on offshore islands.

A commonly proposed but somewhat controversial hypothesis for the appearance of Meiolania is direct dispersal across water, which may range from drifting, floating, walking, and wading to active swimming. While some authors simply suggest that Meiolania was a terrestrial animal capable of swimming, others suggest an aquatic lifestyle altogether. Mittermeier even goes as far as to suggest that meiolaniids had marine ancestors, a hypothesis not favored by modern phylogenetic analysis.

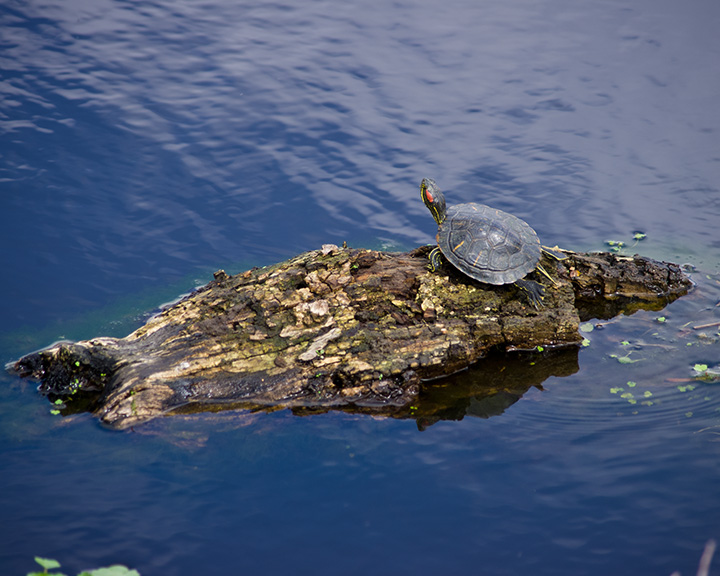
One hypothesis suggests Meiolania could have rafted to distant islands

Brown and Moll (2019) deem active travel through saltwater unlikely and even flat out impossible. According to them the head size, large horns, fused bones, heavy ossification and inability to retract the head, combined with the animal's neck flexibility being primarily adapted for downward movement while grazing, would have caused difficulties with keeping the head above water while swimming or floating. Their limbs are proportionally short and similar to those of tortoises, differing clearly from the flippers of sea turtles and the limbs of other aquatic turtles, making them inefficient tools for active swimming. Adding to that is the likelihood that they were covered in osteoderms, bony scutes, based on basal meiolaniids from South America. The shell shape is another factor against active swimming. While White mentions the highly buoyant shell of modern turtles, the carapace of Meiolania is shaped in a way that traps much less air and thus does not give it the same lift in water as seen in modern species. The highly armored tail on the other hand is likened to an anchor, further decreasing mobility in water. All of these combined would likely lead to the animal drowning if it found itself in open water, especially with the additional factors of exposure and currents working against it. This conclusion is corroborated by the work of Lichtig and Lucas, who consider Meiolania negatively buoyant (although their work is otherwise criticized by Brown and Moll).

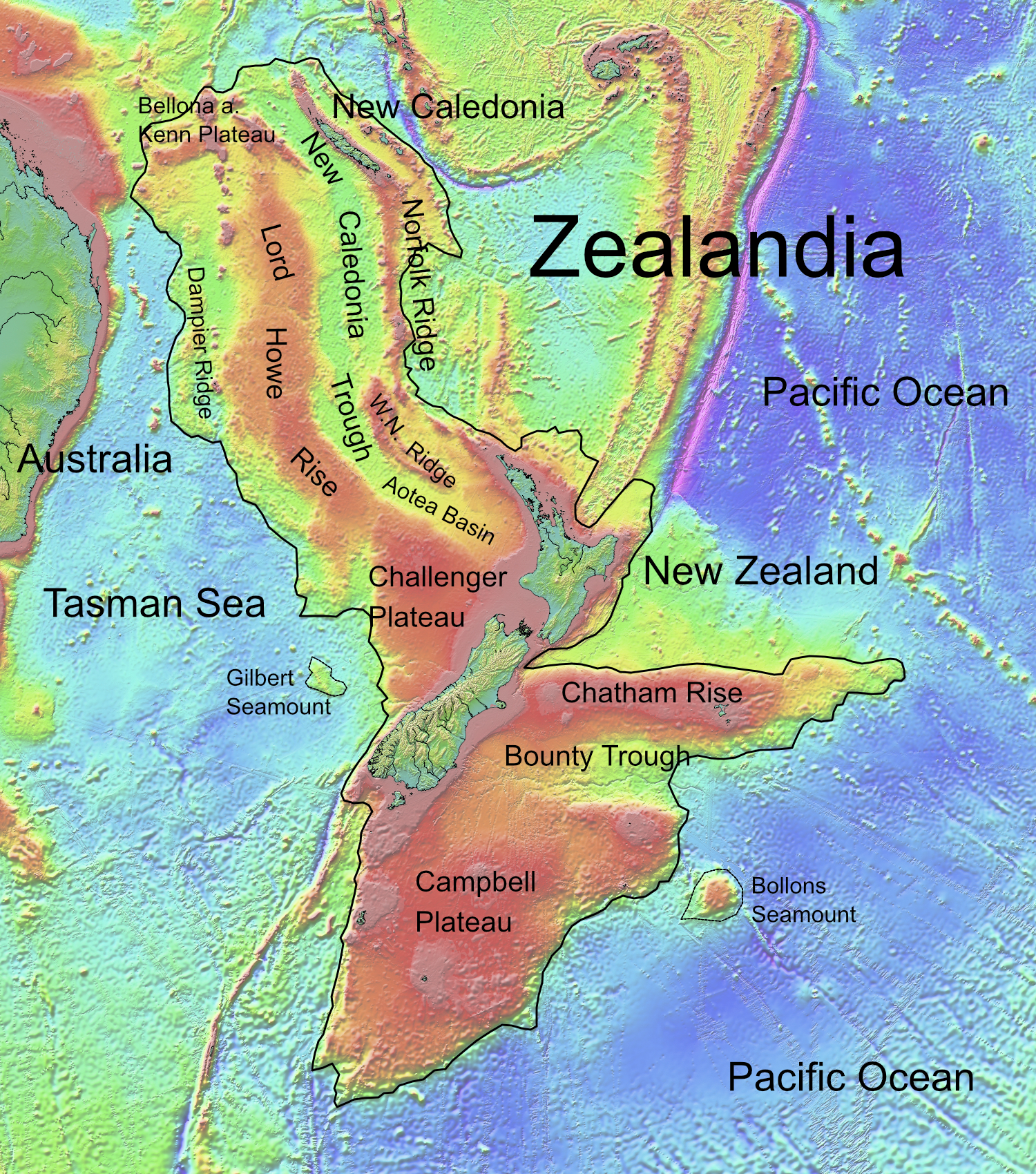
The submerged continent of Zealandia could explain the distribution of Meiolania

While they may not have been actively swimming to settle new islands, another possibility is dispersal through rafting. This mode of dispersal could allow them to arrive on isolated pieces of land through the use of natural platforms, such as tree stumps or masses of debris. This is considered more likely by Brown and Moll, though it comes with its own issues. Adults would have needed large rafts while juveniles would have had to face increased predation once arriving at their destination, while also needing more time to reach sexual maturity. Still, rafting is a valid hypothesis as it is well documented in modern tortoises. Rafting has been used to explain the current existence of giant tortoises on isolated island chains within the Indian Ocean, with Aldabra giant tortoises having been found floating in the open ocean. In 2004 a female Aldabra giant tortoise came ashore at Kimbiji, Tanzania after having travelled 740 km (460 mi) from its home on Grande Terre. However, the turtle was found emaciated and covered in gooseneck barnacles. Another example of rafting giant tortoises was recorded in 1936, when two adult Galápagos tortoises were found adrift 32 km (20 mi) off the coast of Florida, likely after being swept away from a captive colony by a hurricane. At the same time, the retractable neck, center of gravity and greater buoyancy may all be factors in which modern tortoises are better suited at surviving rafting than meiolaniids.

Yet another hypothesis stems from Bauer and Vindum (1990), who suggest that Meiolania could have arrived on New Caledonia not through natural dispersal but because they were introduced there by humans. Although there are known examples of living giant tortoises being transported on ships as a source of food, this hypothesis is nonetheless considered unlikely by Brown and Moll. They point out multiple problems with the idea that render human introduction an impracticle and unlikely scenario. The transport of mature Meiolania would have come with several issues, in particular related to the size and armored, possibly very defensive nature of these animals. Even if humans had been able to subdue and transport large adults over great distances, they would have had to introduce a great number of them in order to sustain the population given the slow reproduction cycles of tortoises. Finally, studies have shown that adult tortoises introduced to new areas are very likely to disperse soon after release if not contained, an inconvenience if the turtle was meant to serve as a foodsource. The introduction of juveniles would be easier logistically due to their smaller size and the increased likelihood of them staying in the area they were released in. However, they too make for a poorly sustainable source of meat due to the long time tortoises take to grow and reproduce, again causing issues with establishing a stable population. Brown and Moll further point out that there is no evidence that the Lapita kept or even domesticated Meiolania.

The final hypotheses for the discovery of meiolaniids on remote islands depends more on geological events and terrestrial movement rather than trans-oceanic travel. One explanation could be found in what is termed the "escalator hopscotch" model. According to this model, an island chain may undergo a process that would see land emerge on one and of the chain and submerged on the other. This may go on in a continuous fashion and thus allow an animal, such as Meiolania, to either travel over directly connected islands or swim through narrow waterways. This means that even if one particular island has only emerged recently, the fauna on it could have arrived from a nearby island that is no longer above sealevel. This scenario can be applied to Meiolania platyceps on Lord Howe Island for instance, as the island is simply the latest in a series of volcanic islands formed by the Lord Howe Rise. Brown and Moll meanwhile favor the hypothesis that Zealandia could have played an important rolle in the dispersal of Meiolania. According to them, many of the islands Meiolania was native to are in fact parts of a now largely submerged Zealandia and could indicate that these turtles were more widespread in the past, only to be "stranded" on the remote islands after the continent was flooded.

== Paleobiology ==
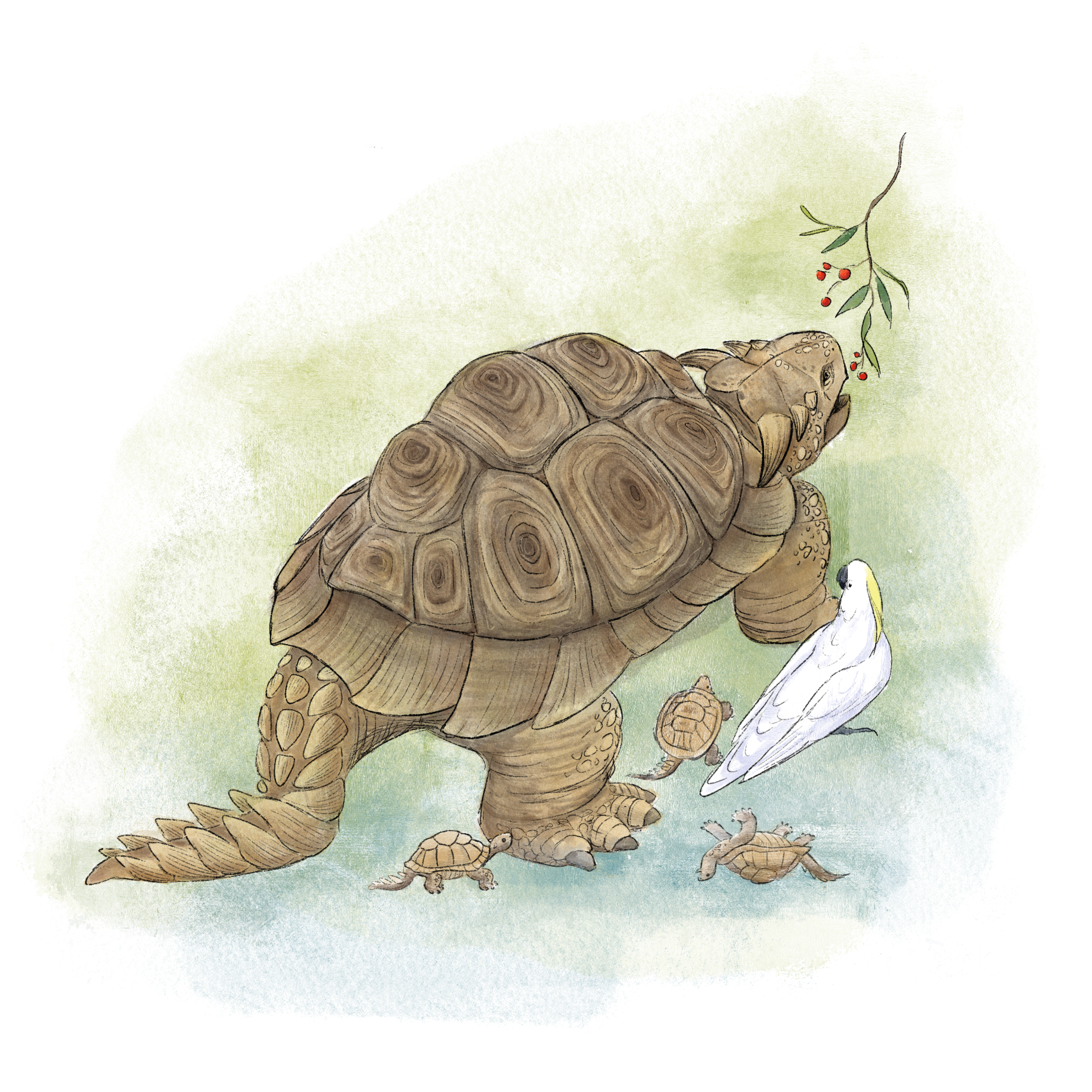
Artistic reconstruction of M. brevicollis

=== Lifestyle ===
The idea that Meiolania was a marine animal has been suggested a multitude of times since its initial discovery. Allan Riverstone McCulloch for instance believed that the fossils on Lord Howe Island were preserved when turtles came ashore to lay their eggs, only to die in the process. Anderson meanwhile, who described a series of limb elements of what he considered to be two different species, likened Meiolania to marsh and river turtles, noting that its limbs were far less specialised than those of true sea turtles. He proposed that Meiolania was more semi-aquatic, inhabiting the shore and estuaries while still being capable of traveling the ocean to disperse to other islands.

Among the most recent publications suggesting a more aquatic way of life was Lichtig and Lucas (2018). Their analysis primarily focused on shell dimension ratios and limb anatomy in comparison to modern turtle species, leading to them proposing that Meiolania was a bottom walker they liken to modern members of the Chelydridae, the snapping turtles. However, this hypothesis was rejected by Brown and Moll the following year. Besides the questionable nature of their ratio-based approach, the two authors point out that Lichtig and Lucas based their conclusion on a single juvenile specimen which was a composite reconstruction, thus not only providing an extremely poor sample size but also not reflecting the real proportions of the animal, much less those of an adult. Yet another problem pointed out by Brown and Moll is that the aquatic nature proposed in the Lichtig and Lucas study only results from one of the two calculations offered by them.

Most other authors, historical as well as contemporary, support the idea that Meiolania was terrestrial. One study with major implications for this hypothesis was published by Paulina-Carabajal et al. in 2017. In this study, the endocasts of the meiolaniids Meiolania, Gaffneylania and Niolamia were scanned and analyzed, with particular focus on the nasal cavity and inner ear. One particularly noteworthy feature in this regard is the elongated vestibulum of the nose. This is compared to two groups of animals, on the one hand some species of turtles with snorkel-like noses (softshell turtles, mata matas and pig-nosed turtles) and on the other lizards living in dry and arid conditions. In case of the latter, the elongated vestibulum helps keep sand out of the animals nose, which is particularly useful in deserts or other sandy environments. This matches the fact that some researchers have suggested that Meiolania platyceps was a beachgoing animal, spending at least parts of its life in sandy areas, even if only to lay eggs. The size of the nasal cavity (cavum nasi proprium) itself is also indicative of a terrestrial lifestyle. Generally, aquatic turtles possess the smallest nasal cavities in living testudines, while those of terrestrial tortoises are notably larger and allow for a better sense of smell. The nasal cavity of meiolaniids meanwhile is even greater. A similar relation can be seen in the inner ear anatomy, especially the wide angle between the anterior and posterior semicircular canals. This angle only measures between 80 and 95° in aquatic turtles, 100° in tortoises and 115° in meiolaniids. The inner ear anatomy of tortoises and meiolaniids is generally associated with stabilizing the head while walking, while aquatic turtles are built to deal with rolling during swimming. Various aspects of its general morphology also draw closer comparison to terrestrial tortoises than aquatic ones, such as the robustness of the limbs, the rounded head of the femur and the shape of the shoulder girdle.

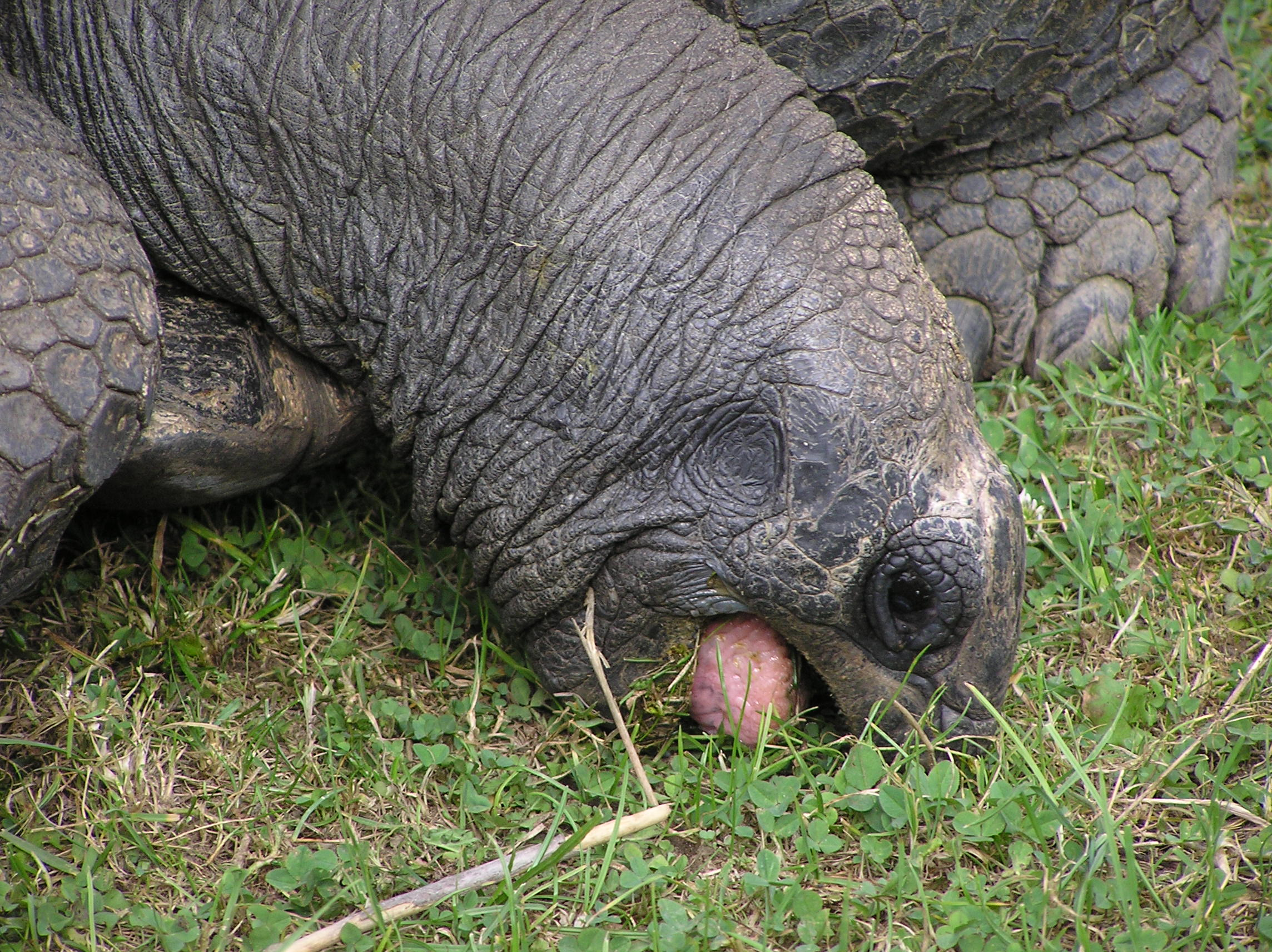
Studies on the neck suggest that Meiolania was a grazer, feeding on low growing herbs and fallen fruit.

=== Diet ===
Multiple aspects of Meiolania's anatomy have been used to infer its diet. The flexibility of the neck being largely focused on side to side movement and restricted by the projection of the carapace as well as the weight of the horns are thought to indicate that Meiolania was a terrestrial grazer. It likely fed on a variety of plant material including various herbaceous plants, ferns and perhaps even the fallen fruit of palm trees. Although this may have been its preferred way of feeding, it is not entirely impossible that Meiolania could have occasionally browsed on low hanging vegetation. The mild climate of Lord Howe Island would have provided the turtle with a consistent supply of food and it is possible that Meiolania periodically wandered across the island in search of food, appearing seasonally in certain regions. Foraging could have made use of the enhanced sense of smell proposed by Paulina-Carabajal and colleagues. While it is possible that ?Meiolania damelipi was not a meiolaniid, isotopic analysis does line up with the ecology of Meiolania platyceps, suggesting an herbivorous to omnivorous diet.

=== Reproduction ===
Although nothing concrete is known about the mating behavior of Meiolania, a widespread hypothesis suggests that the highly ornamented skull, armored limbs and tail club could have served a function in intraspecific combat between rival males during the mating season. Combat may have been instigated through chemical cues produced by one of the many scent glands found in modern turtles (musk glands, cloacal secretions and mental glands). While such glands are not preserved in fossils, the enlarged nasal cavity and inferred heightened sense of smell support this interpretation. Modern tortoises engage with rivals primarily through maneuvers performed with the shell, including knocking, ramming, twisting and others. Combat between Meiolania specimens could further involve the use of armored limbs, the spiked tails covered in bony rings and the large horns situated atop the animal's head. This may also explain the great sideways mobility that has been inferred for Meiolania's neck.

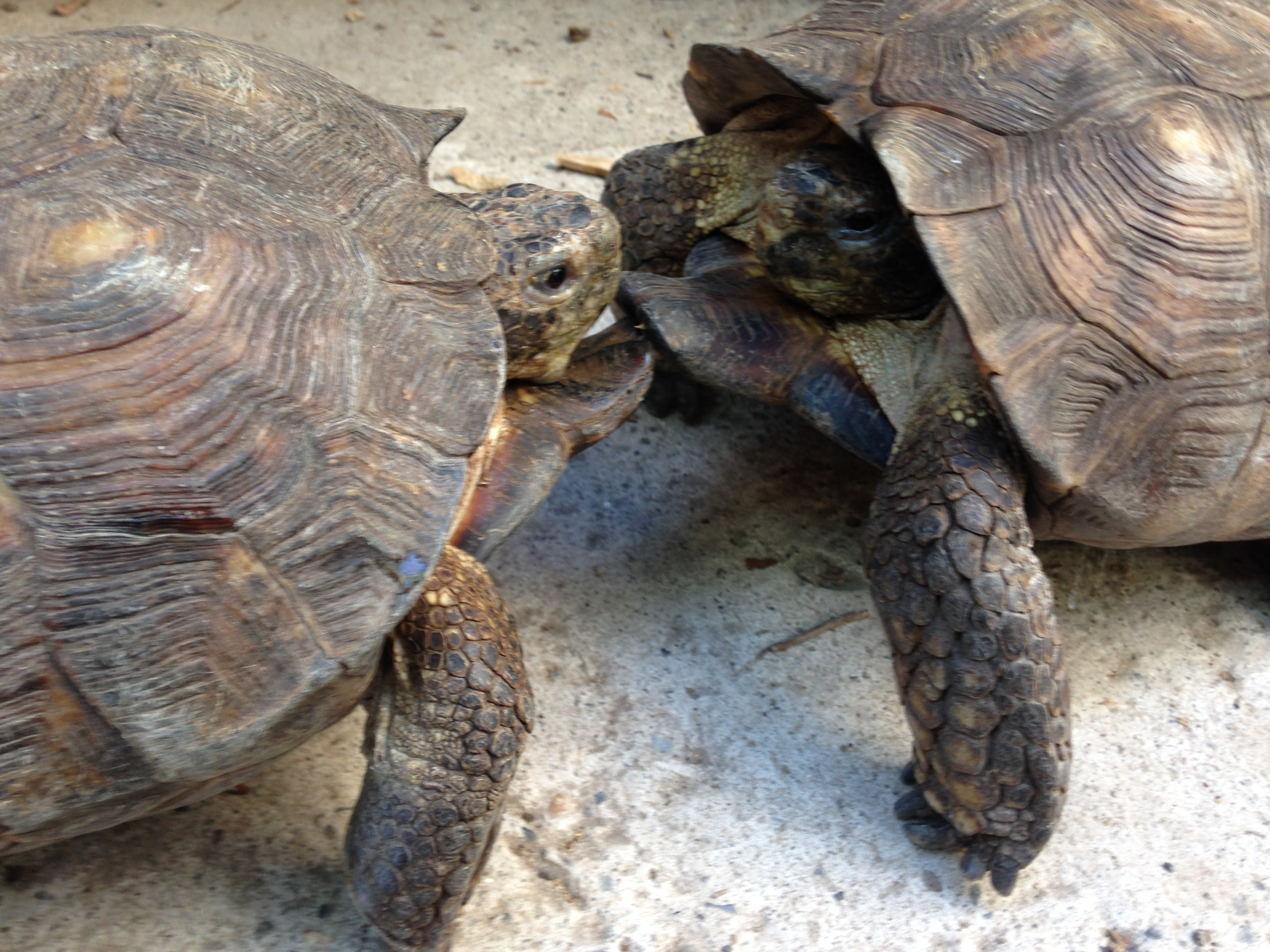
The spiked bodies of Meiolania could have been used in combat between individuals.

Meiolania platyceps is thought to have at least occasionally traversed the beaches of Lord Howe Island, at the very least while laying eggs. This is evident through the discovery of egg clutches on Lord Howe Island, which are placed in the oogenus Testudoolithus lordhowensis. These eggs have been assigned to Meiolania in the absence of other turtles from the island, as well as the close association between eggs and Meiolania fossils in some localities. Furthermore, the eggs are rigid and thus differ clearly from the more pliable eggs that would be produced by sea turtles. Based on these fossils, Meiolania laid large, spherical eggs that measured 53.9 mm (2.12 in) across, likely weighed 85.91 g (3.030 oz) and were slightly higher than wide (1.2:1). This makes the eggs the largest fossil turtle eggs known and only smaller than the eggs laid by modern Galapagos and Aldabra giant tortoises. Study of the gas conductance of the fossil eggshells allowed for comparison with modern turtles in order to determine the potential nesting strategy. Analysis showed that the eggs were highly conductive, lacking adaptations against water evaporation as seen in bird eggs, and were thus likely laid in a hole nest in a high moisture environment, for example a sandy beach. This confirms that the beach likely was the area intentionally sought out by these animals. The clutch that serves as the holotype for T. lordhowensis consists of a minimum of 10 eggs, laid across two layers within a single nest.

== Extinction ==
Due to the great range of Meiolania, which covered many ecosystems entirely independent from each other, the genus' extinction is thought to have been a multifaceted process caused by various factors not directly tied to one another.

On Lord Howe, the rising sea levels following the end of the last ice age greatly decreased the land area of the island, which may have led to the demise of the turtles on the island. This does not account for extinctions on other islands that retained a much more significant land area. It is unclear just how long Meiolania survived across most of its range and if they ever came in contact with humans.

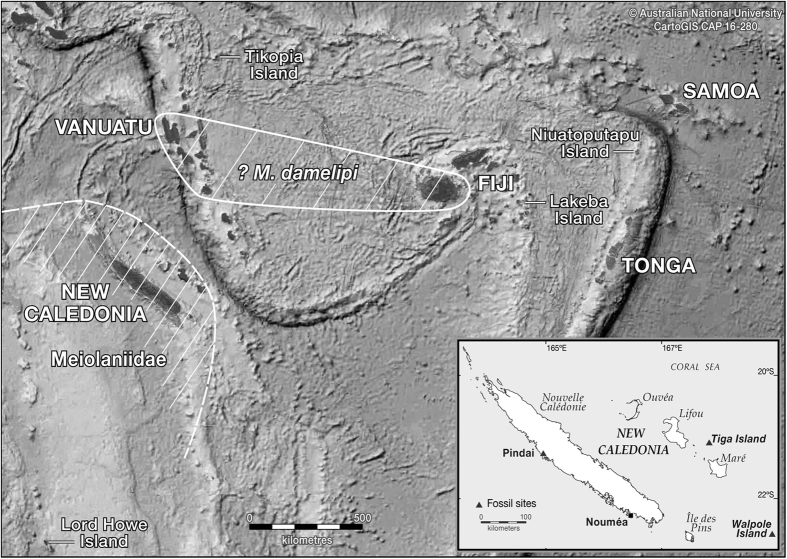
Range of potential meiolaniid turtles in the South Pacific

However, there are potential exceptions to this. Among the most recent records of Meiolania may be that of ?M. damelipi from Vanuatu (assuming the remains are actually those of a meiolaniid). These remains were initially found in archaeological layers above those of a human graveyard, with the remains dating to roughly 2,800 BP. Later studies identified similar sites across Vanuatu and Fiji, greatly extending the area across which humans and megafaunal turtles came in contact with each other. White and colleagues propose that the turtles at the Vanuatu site may have been butchered for their meat based on the fact that only limb bones were present in abundance, i.e. parts of the turtle that would have been much fleshier than the diagnostic skulls and tails. The bones recovered at the site show clear signs of being cut up and consumed, showing marks left by cutting tools, burns and fractures in addition to all bones being found in association with human settlements. Although hunting of turtles by the Lapita people may have been a contributing factor, the Pleistocene overkill hypothesis remains a controversial idea among researchers. Perhaps a more important factor could have been the introduction of invasive species to the fragile island ecosystem, namely pigs, which would have fed on eggs and juvenile turtles. Whatever the precise combination of factors, ?Meiolania damelipi appears to have disappeared from the island only 300 years after the first humans settled there. A similar pattern can be observed with regards to the extinction of island crocodiles and birds across the western Pacific.

Another, even younger, instance of a meiolaniid surviving into human times stems from New Caledonia. The remains from Pindai Cave have been dated to 1720 ± 70 years BP ((160–300 AD) via uncalibrated radiocarbon dating and 1820–1419 years BP (130–531 AD) through calibrated 14C dating. While it is unclear whether or not these remains belong to Meiolania itself like those from nearby Walpole Island, it is at least confirmed to actually represent a meiolaniid, unlike the uncertainty regarding ?M. damelipi.

== See also ==
- Biodiversity of New Caledonia
- Holocene extinction
