= Elizabeth Carrington Pope =

New Zealand-born Australian zoologist and marine biologist (1912–1993)

Elizabeth Carrington Pope (1912 – 18 September 1993) was a New Zealand-born zoologist and marine biologist. She was born in Nelson in 1912, and migrated to Bellevue Hill, Australia with her family that same year. Pope was curator of worms and echinoderms at the Australian Museum, and was deputy director of the museum for one year before her retirement in 1972.

== Career ==
Pope was a scientist, responsible for discovering new seashore species and establishing the baseline data that is used to understand temperature and sea-level changes in Australia today. She had a prolific publishing career, including many scientific articles and sea-shore-exploring guides, including the popular Australian seashores: a guide for the beach-lover, the naturalist, the shore fishermen, and the student, and Exploring between tidemarks: an introduction to seashore ecology. Pope was also a science communicator, sharing knowledge with the public and engaging new-career researchers and the fishery industry in her work.

Pope began her career at a time when it was difficult to establish a career in science as a woman, with her starting museum assistant salary 45 per cent lower than that of her male counterparts. The gender divide that was the background of her research career drove much of her work, and she paved the way for many female marine biologists and museologists, becoming the first female deputy director of the Australian Museum in 1971. She was also active outside of the museum industry, holding posts as president of the Linnean Society of New South Wales, as a fellow of the Royal Zoological Society, and as a member of the Zoological Society of London.
