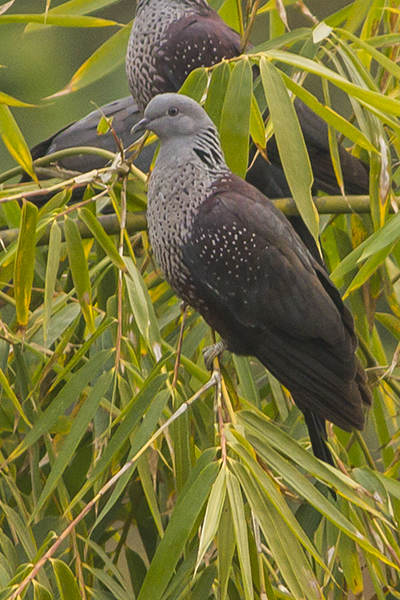
- Speckled wood pigeon from Pangolakha WLS in East Sikkim, India.

Conservation status
- Least Concern (IUCN 3.1)

Scientific classification
- Kingdom: Animalia
- Phylum: Chordata
- Class: Aves
- Order: Columbiformes
- Family: Columbidae
- Genus: Columba
- Species: C. hodgsonii

Binomial name
- Columba hodgsonii Vigors, 1832

= Speckled wood pigeon =

Species of bird

The speckled wood pigeon (Columba hodgsonii), also known as Hodgson's pigeon or the jungle pigeon, is a medium-sized pigeon of the bird family Columbidae and genus Columba. It is a monotypic species. It measures 38–40 cm (15–15.5 in) in length, with males featuring a pale gray head and females having a grayish-brown head. Males have a distinctive pinkish-silver breast speckled with black spots and a maroon belly, while females exhibit less vibrant coloration. Both sexes have blackish-brown tails and primaries, iris color differs slightly. The species is distributed across the Himalayas extending from Kashmir to western and central China, as well as parts of India, Myanmar, Laos, Thailand, Pakistan, Nepal, Bhutan, and Afghanistan. Inhabiting evergreen and semi-evergreen hill forests at elevations of 1,800–4,000 meters (5,900–13,100 ft), descend in winter based on food availability. Diet consists mainly of acorns, berries, and fruits, typically foraging in small flocks. Breeding occurs from May to August, with nests situated 3–8 meters (9.8–26.2 ft) above ground.

== Taxonomy ==
The speckled wood pigeon was formally described by the Irish zoologist and politician Nicholas Aylward Vigors in 1832, who was the co-founder of the Zoological Society of London in 1826. Another person associated with this species is naturalist and ethnologist Brian Houghton Hodgson, it is believed that he sent the description of this species to Zoological Society prior to 1832 but was not published, he is acknowledged in the scientific name of the species.

Speckled wood pigeon is a monotypic species. It is considered to be an Asiatic representative of Columba arquatrix, together with other olive pigeons including Columba sjostedti, Columba thomensis, and Columba pollenii as the five members of a superspecies.

== Description ==
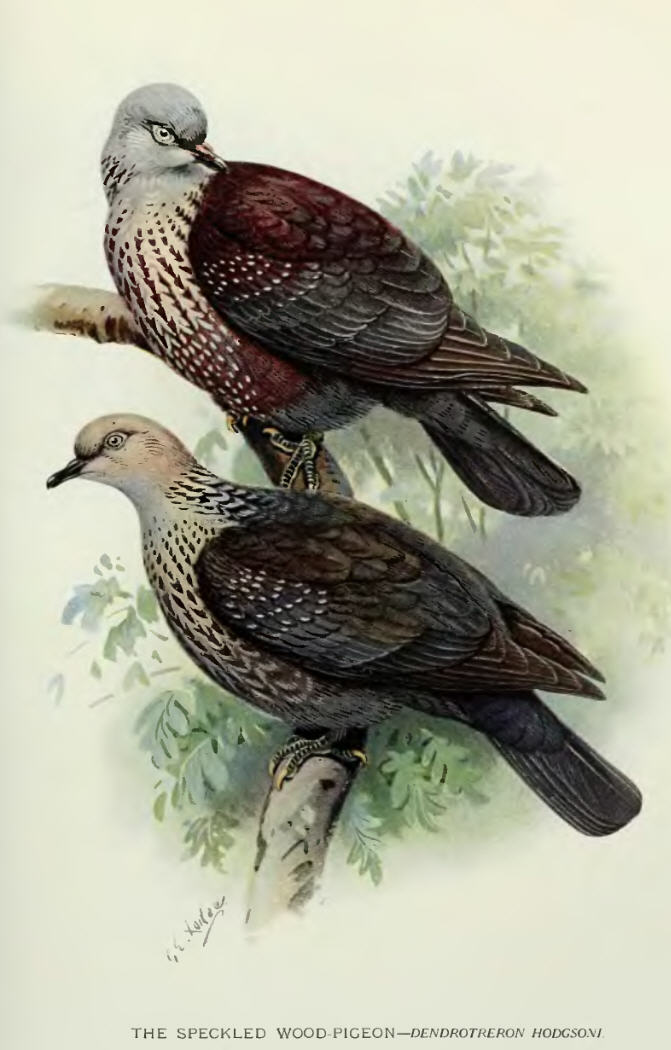
Speckled wood pigeon illustration in Indian Pigeons and Doves (1913)

General Characteristics: Size of the Speckled wood pigeon is usually 38–40 cm (15–15.5 in) for adults. Adult male has a pale gray head, while female's head is grayish-brown, juvenile resembles the female but browner and paler than female. Adult male has a pinkish-silver breast and side of neck area, speckled with black spots, each feather on the breast area has a silver base, dark central streak, and the tip is silvery-pink. Hindneck feathers have black or purplish-black bases with silver tips, creating a speckled appearance. Female neck and breast color in less vibrant tones compared to male.

Plumage: Mantle and wing-coverts of male is dark reddish-purple/burgundy/maroon on the upper part, turning into bluish-gray on the outer wing-coverts. Upper mantle has silver flecks, and white spots on inner and median wing-coverts. In female, scapulars and mantle lack of maroon coloration and replaced with slaty dark brown. Speckles on the juvenile is indistinct.

Tail and primaries black/blackish-brown in both male and female, underwing and undertail is blackish.

Belly/abdomen is maroon/dark-reddish purple with pinkish-white streaks in male, each feather with white fringes and is purplish. Females have dark brownish gray underparts without maroon coloration.

Legs are brownish yellow-greenish in adults. Bright yellow claws.

Beak transitions from blueish-purple at the base to black at the tips.

Iris white-gray in males, gray-brown tinges in female as well, juvenile paler iris colors compared to adults.

== Distribution and habitat ==
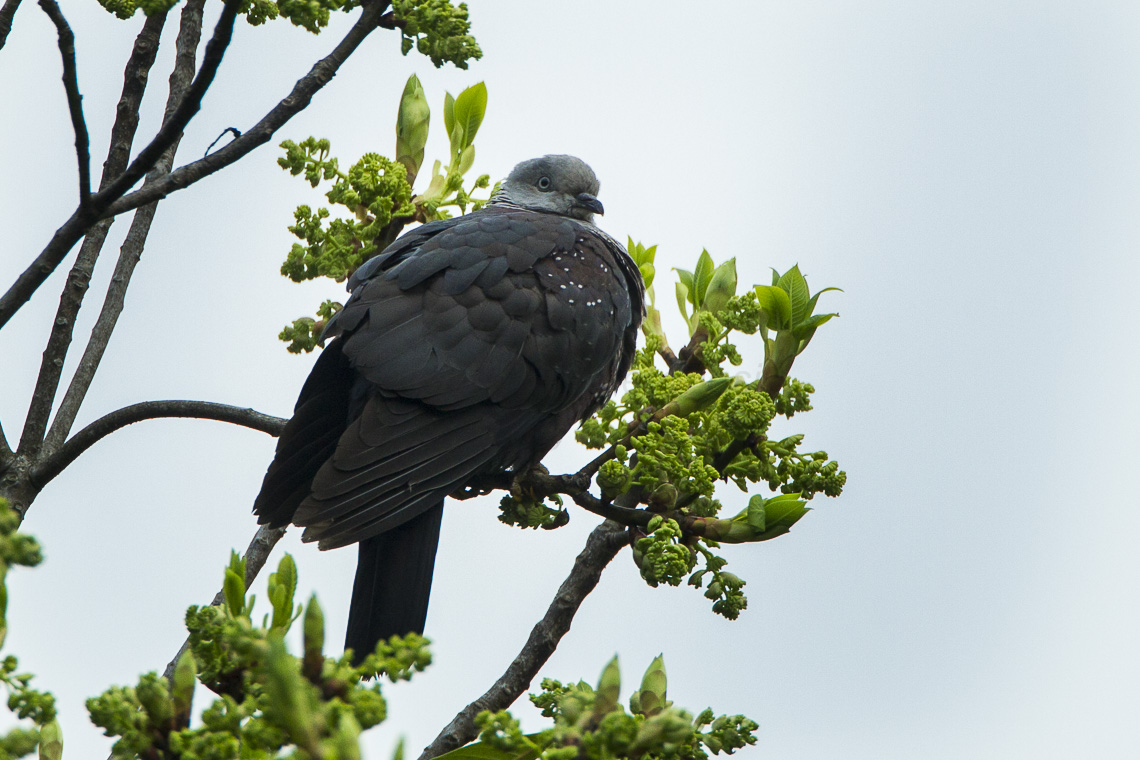
Speckled Wood-Pigeon from Bhutan.

Distribution: Speckled wood pigeon is distributed across the Himalayas, from Kashmir to western and central China (Including southern Gansu, western Sichuan, and western Yunnan), the presence of this species is also found in India, Myanmar, northern and western Thailand, northern and western Laos, Pakistan, Nepal, Bhutan, and Afghanistan.

Habitat: Speckled wood pigeons inhabit tall evergreen and semi-evergreen hill forests, particularly those dominated by oak and Rhododendron, at altitudes ranging from 1,800–4,000 meters (5,900–13,100 ft), though it may descend to as low as 1,350 meters (4,430 ft) in winter depending on food availability. Sometimes observed in open treeless valley bottoms.

== Diet ==
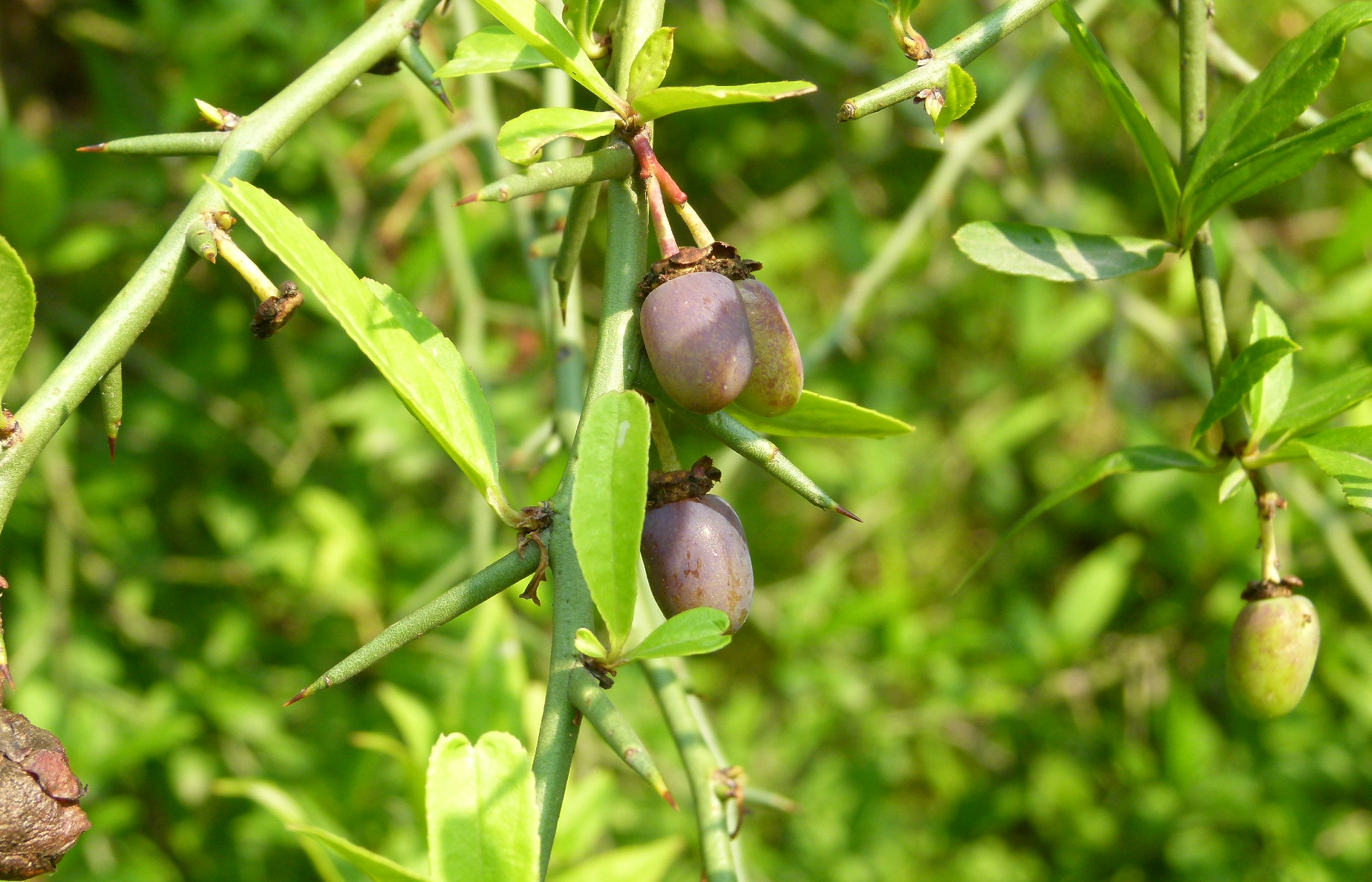
Fruits of Prinsepia utilis

Primarily frugivorous and granivorous, foraging primarily on acorns, berries, drupes, and fruits like those from Prinsepia utilis. They are also known to feed on herbs and cereals. Often gathering on the ground to consume leftover grains in fields after harvest. Have been observed feeding on the acorns of brown oak (Quercus semecarpifollia) and fig (Ficus). Typically feed in pairs, small groups, or flocks of 6-10 individuals.

== Breeding ==
Speckled wood pigeons typically breed from May to June, with some extending into August, especially at altitudes between 1,800 and 3,300 meters (5,900 and 10,800 ft). The earlier part of the breeding season tend to be more productive. Their nests are platforms made of interlaced twigs, placed in oak trees or nullahs (narrow valleys or dry streams) commonly found in mountainous regions of India and Pakistan. Nests typically situated 3–8 meters (9.8–26.2 ft) above the ground. The clutch usually consists of a single bright white egg. Do not perform elaborate courtship displays. Incubation period unknown.

== Movements ==
Mostly resident, but undertake local and altitudinal movements in response to food availability. In some cases, birds observed in northern Thailand during the winter may be migrants from more northern regions.

== Vocalizations ==
Generally quiet and rarely vocalize, therefore limited information on vocalization. When they do call, their voice is characterized by a deep, throaty sound, described as "whock-whroo..whrooo". Call begins with a surprising first note, followed by a series of rolling sounds, with the third note being longer than the first. Often used as an alarm/warning signal.

== Status and conservation ==
Speckled wood pigeon is not considered globally threatened and is classified as "Least Concern" on the IUCN Red List of Threatened Species, with most recent assessment conducted in 2016. It is generally regarded as an rare and uncommon species, due to much of its range is in remote and inaccessible areas. Many available data are often anecdotal.
