= Olive pigeon =

The olive pigeons are four allopatric species of pigeon, named for their association with olive (Olea) species. They have a maroon tone to the speckled plumage, and inhabit cool, montane forests of Africa and its associated islands. Together with the speckled wood pigeon, they are seen as members of a superspecies, which has affinities with the white-naped pigeon.

- African olive pigeon, Columba arquatrix
- Cameroon olive pigeon, Columba sjostedti
- São Tomé olive pigeon, Columba thomensis
- Comoros olive pigeon, Columba pollenii
- Speckled wood pigeon, Columba hodgsonii, of Asia
