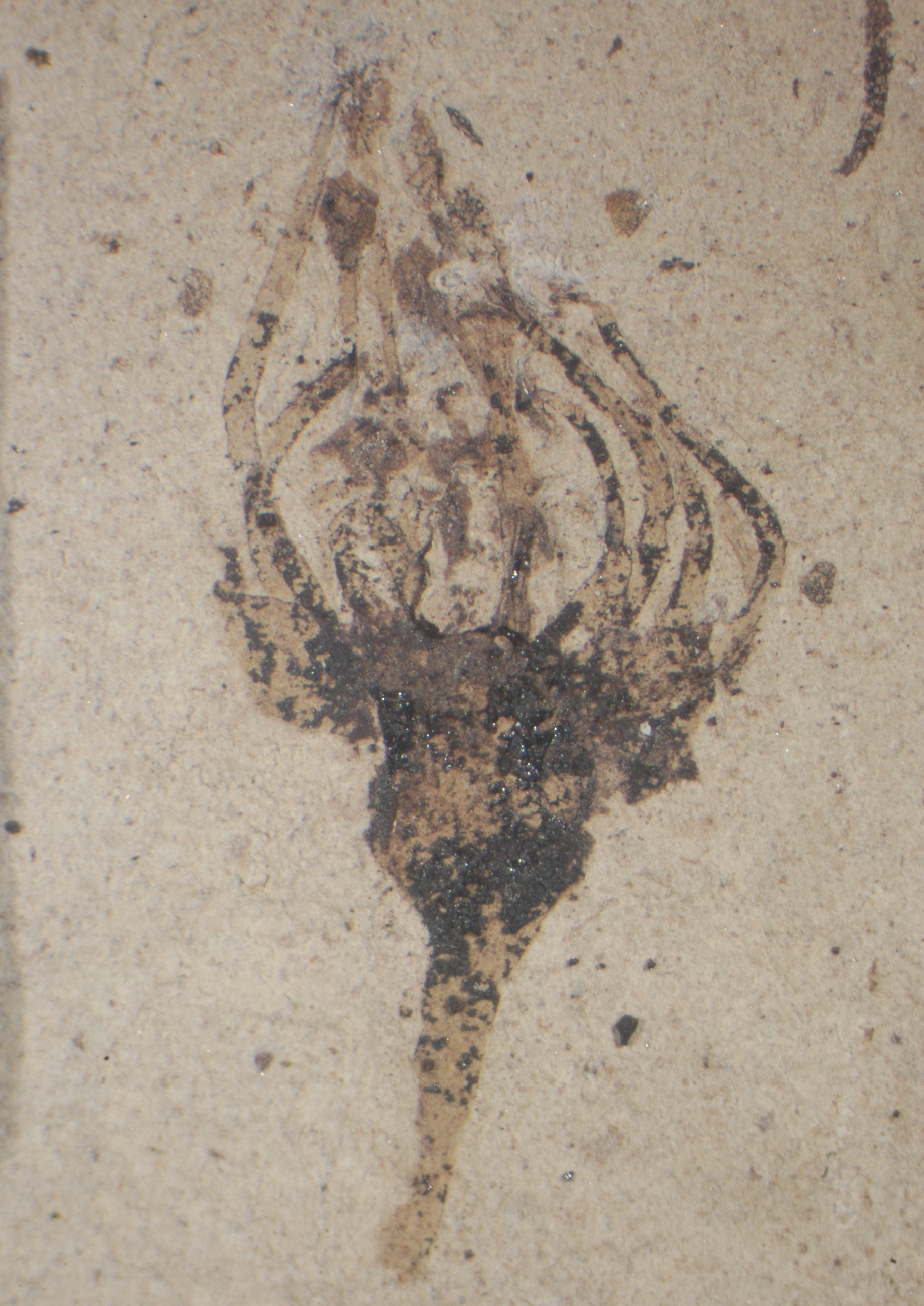
- Prunus cathybrownae holotype

Scientific classification
- Kingdom: Plantae
- Clade: Tracheophytes
- Clade: Angiosperms
- Clade: Eudicots
- Clade: Rosids
- Order: Rosales
- Family: Rosaceae
- Genus: Prunus
- Species: †P. cathybrownae

Binomial name
- †Prunus cathybrownae Benedict, DeVore, & Pigg

= Prunus cathybrownae =

Prunus cathybrownae Temporal range: 51–49 Ma Early Eocene (Ypresian)

Extinct species of flowering plant

Prunus cathybrownae is an extinct species of cherry in the family Rosaceae. It was described from eight fossil flowers found in the Okanagan Highlands of Washington state. All of the flowers had no petals, suggesting they were dropped during anthesis, as is common with modern members of Prunus.

== Distribution ==
The Prunus cathybrownae fossils were all recovered from a single site in the Eocene Okanagan Highlands of Central British Columbia and northeast central Washington state. Both of the described specimens are from the Klondike Mountain Formation in Northern Ferry County, Washington, being recovered from the "Boot Hill" site B4131 in Republic, Washington.

Early estimates of the highlands sites ranged from Miocene to Eocene in age. The age of the Klondike Mountain Formation was debated for many years, with plant fossils suggesting a Late Oligocene or Early Miocene age, and the first descriptions of species from the area included them in the Middle Miocene Latah Formation. By the early 1960's the Klondike Mountain formation was thought to be late Oligocene in age. Potassium-argon radiometric dating of samples taken near the Tom Thumb mine in 1966 resulted in a tentative 55 million years old age. Further refinement of sample dating has yielded an approximately Early Eocene, Ypresian age, being radiometrically dated as 49.4 million years old. A 2003 report using dating of detrital zircon crystals with the tuffs of the Klondike Mountain Formation had been dated to 49.42 ± 0.54 million years ago, the youngest of the Okanagan Highlands sites, A 2021 report revised the possible oldest age to around 51.2 ± 0.1 million years ago based on isotopic data from zircon crystals.

== History and classification ==
Flowers with affinities to Prunus were first figured and very briefly mentioned by Melanie DeVore and Katherine Pigg's 2007 review paper on the fossil history of the Rosaceae. Figured in the paper were three fossils which they labeled as "Prunus-like flowers" and are described as flowers to young fruits that are being studied for pollen. A year later the flowers were again mentioned, with an oral presentation on the flowers, their probable affinities, and the progress in study. The presentation was given by John Benedict, a graduate student of Kathleen Pigg and lead paleobotanist studying the fossils, at the 2008 Vancouver British Columbia Botanical Society of America meeting.

Benedict, with DeVore and Pigg, formally described the flowers in a 2011 International Journal of Plant Sciences peer-reviewed article in combination with the description of the rosaceous osoberry species Oemleria janhartfordae identified during examination of the Prunus specimens. They designated the holotype specimen "SR 96-11-47 A&B", and selected a series of 10 paratypes all from the collections of the Stonerose Interpretive Center in Republic, Washington. The flowers were collected by Center staff members and public fossil diggers who donated the specimens to Stonerose. Benedict, DeVore, and Pigg coined the species name cathybrownae as a matronym honoring three generations of Catherine Browns for their work at Stonerose: Catherine Evelyn Brown, artist and Stonerose supporter, her daughter Catherine Louise Brown, then director of Stonerose, and Catherine Clementine Brown, a special assistant at Stonerose.

The broader Okanagan Highlands has preserved leaves, fruits, and wood as well as flowers identified to the genus Prunus. The first named prunoid from the highlands comes from the Allenby Formations Princeton Chert near Princeton, British Columbia. Sergio R. S. Cevallos-Ferriz and Ruth Stockey (1990) named the wood morphospecies Prunus allenbyensis based on permineralized branches and sticks. A year later they documented a group of three preserved Prunus fruits that belong to the subgenus Prunus subg. Prunus which encompasses apricots, peaches, and plums. Due to a lack of descriptive data for modern Prunus subg. Prunus endocarps and seeds, Cevallos-Ferriz and Stockey did not describe new species, as they could not determine how many species may be present. They noted Jack A. Wolfe and Wesley Wehr had documented the occurrence of three undescribed Prunus leaf morphospecies at Republic, and noted the probability of multiple species in the seeds as correlation with the leaves.

Prunus cathybrownae has been used as a fossil age datapoint and in the calibration of several Rosaceae family divergence studies. Both it and Prunus wutuensis from the Wutu flora of China are similar in age and have differing sets of mosaic morphologies.

== Description ==
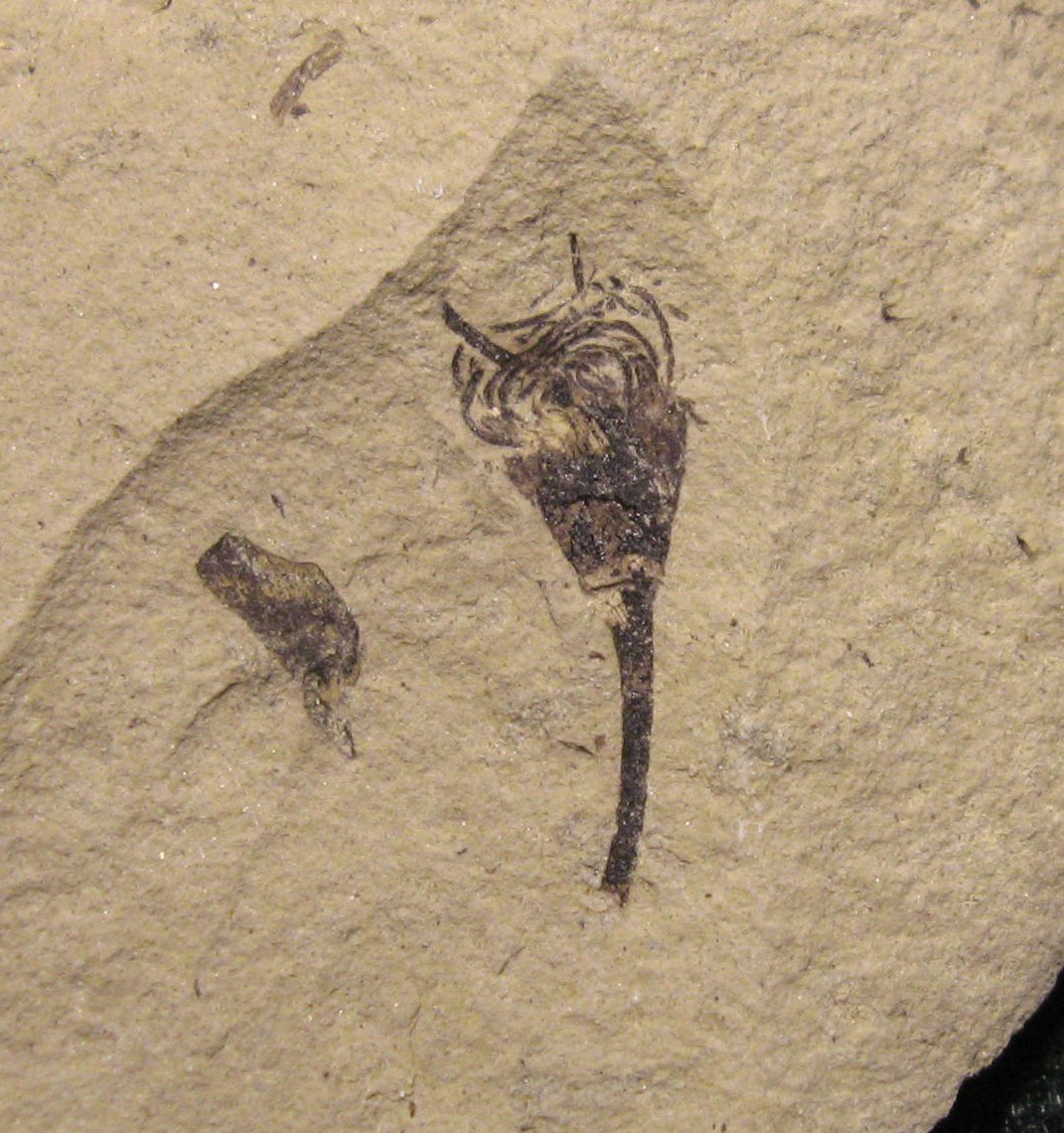
Maturing flower with bent style

Prunus cathybrownae is known from a grade of flowers to fruits, with eight mature flowers and an additional two young fruits. All specimens are pedicellate, with pedicel lengths between 3–15 mm (1/8–9/16 in), though no complete pedicels are known. The specimens have a bell shaped hypanthium that is 4–6 mm (3/16–1/4 in) wide and 3–4 mm (1/8–3/16 in) tall on average. No petals have been found attached to the flower fossils, despite the frequency of isolated petal fossils in the same strata. Benedict, DeVore, and Pigg took this as an indication the flowers likely shed the petals after opening in the same way modern Prunus species do. The androecium consists of approximately twelve stamens grouped in two whorls, with the outer whorl stamens being about 6 mm (1/4 in) tall and more erect than the inner whorl. The inner stamens are curled downward and only extend up to the base of the style. the flowers have a Half-inferior ovary partially raised from the surrounding flower tissue. At the tip of the ovary is the style which is between 1–4 mm (1/16–3/16 in) long. Pollen was recovered from the holotype flower after fragments of an inner and an outer anther were removed from the specimen. The inner anthers preserved globs of numerous immature pollen grains which were coated in gold for examination. The outer anther had mature tricolporate grain recovered by acid washing and then zinc chloride heavy liquid recovery.

== Paleoenvironment ==
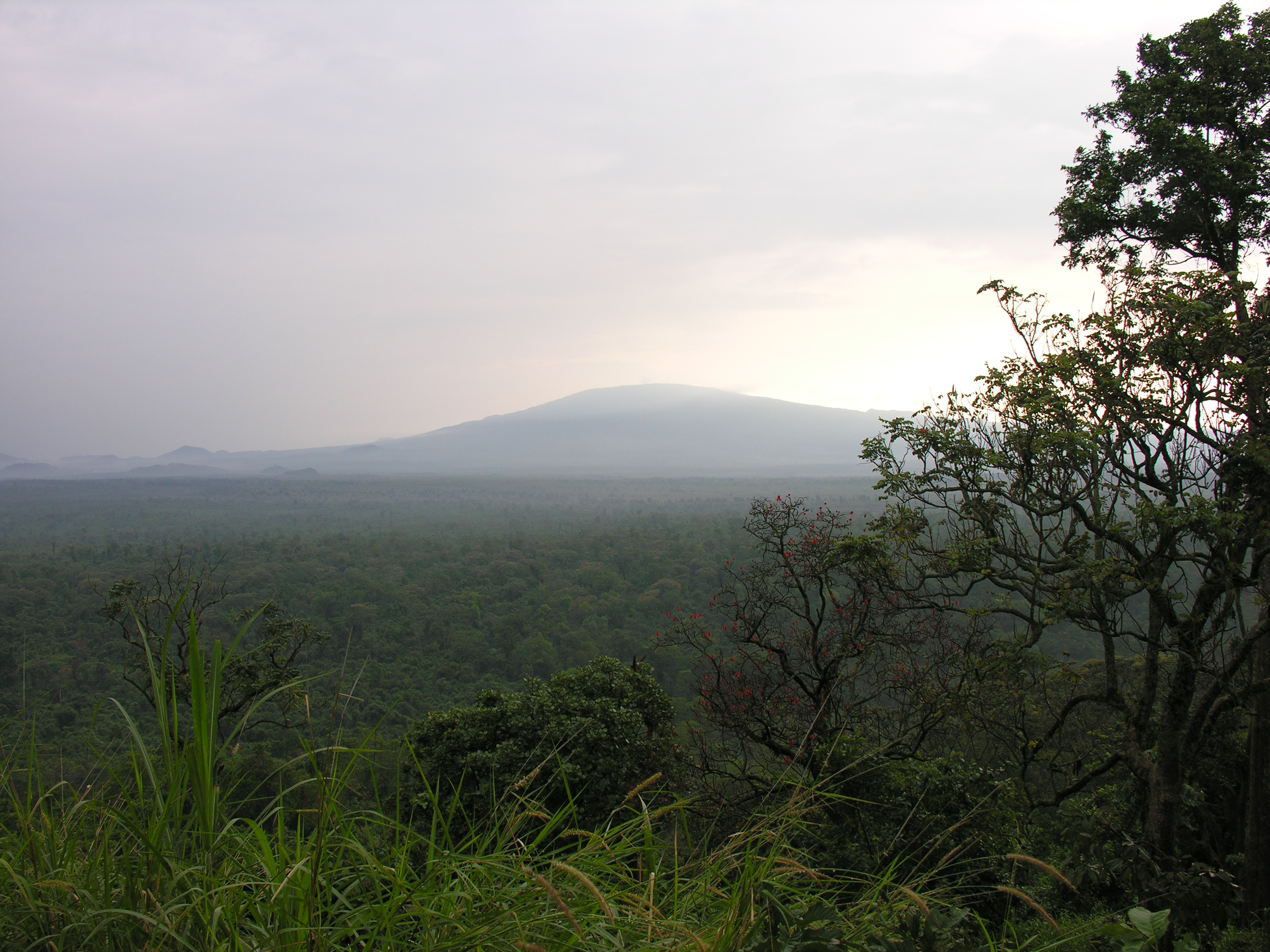
Virunga National Park, Albertine Rift, Africa

The Republic sites are part of a larger fossil site system collectively known as the Eocene Okanagan Highlands. The highlands, including the Early Eocene formations between Driftwood Canyon at the north and Republic at the south, have been described as one of the "Great Canadian Lagerstätten" based on the diversity, quality and unique nature of the paleofloral and paleofaunal biotas that are preserved. The highlands temperate biome preserved across a large transect of lakes recorded many of the earliest appearances of modern genera, while also documenting the last stands of ancient lines. The warm temperate highland floras in association with downfaulted lacustrine basins and active volcanism are noted to have no exact modern equivalents. This is due to the more seasonally equitable conditions of the Early Eocene, resulting in much lower seasonal temperature shifts. However, the highlands have been compared to the upland ecological islands of the Virunga Mountains within the Albertine Rift.

The Klondike Mountain Formation represents an upland lake system that was surrounded by a warm temperate ecosystem with nearby volcanism dating from during and just after the early Eocene climatic optimum. The Okanagan Highlands likely had a mesic upper microthermal to lower mesothermal climate, in which winter temperatures rarely dropped low enough for snow, and which were seasonably equitable. The paleoforest surrounding the lakes have been described as precursors to the modern temperate broadleaf and mixed forests of Eastern North America and Eastern Asia. Based on the fossil biotas the lakes were higher and cooler then the coeval coastal forests preserved in the Puget Group and Chuckanut Formation of Western Washington, which are described as lowland tropical forest ecosystems. Estimates of the paleoelevation range between 0.7 and 1.2 km (0.43 and 0.75 mi) higher than the coastal forests. This is consistent with the paleoelevation estimates for the lake systems, which range between 1.1 and 2.9 km (1,100 and 2,900 m), which is similar to the modern elevation 0.8 km (0.50 mi), but higher.

Estimates of the mean annual temperature have been derived from climate leaf analysis multivariate program (CLAMP) analysis and leaf margin analysis (LMA) of the Republic paleoflora. The CLAMP results after multiple linear regressions gave a mean annual temperature of approximately 8.0 °C (46.4 °F), with the LMA giving 9.2 ± 2.0 °C (48.6 ± 3.6 °F). A bioclimatic-based estimate based on modern relatives of the taxa found at Republic suggested mean annual temperatures around 13.5 ± 2.2 °C (56.3 ± 4.0 °F). This is lower than the mean annual temperature estimates given for the coastal Puget Group, which is estimated to have been between 15 and 18.6 °C (59.0 and 65.5 °F). The bioclimatic analysis for Republic suggests a mean annual precipitation amount of 115 ± 39 cm (45 ± 15 in).
