= Oemleria janhartfordae =

Oemleria janhartfordae Temporal range: Ypresian

Scientific classification
- Kingdom: Plantae
- Clade: Tracheophytes
- Clade: Angiosperms
- Clade: Eudicots
- Clade: Rosids
- Order: Rosales
- Family: Rosaceae
- Genus: Oemleria
- Species: †O. janhartfordae

Binomial name
- †Oemleria janhartfordae Benedict, DeVore, & Pigg

Extinct Eocene rose family species

Oemleria janhartfordae is an extinct species of osoberry in the family Rosaceae. It was described from a single fossil flower found in the Okanagan Highlands of Washington state. The species has been used as a dating point for both the rose family and the rose family tribe Exochordeae.

== Distribution ==
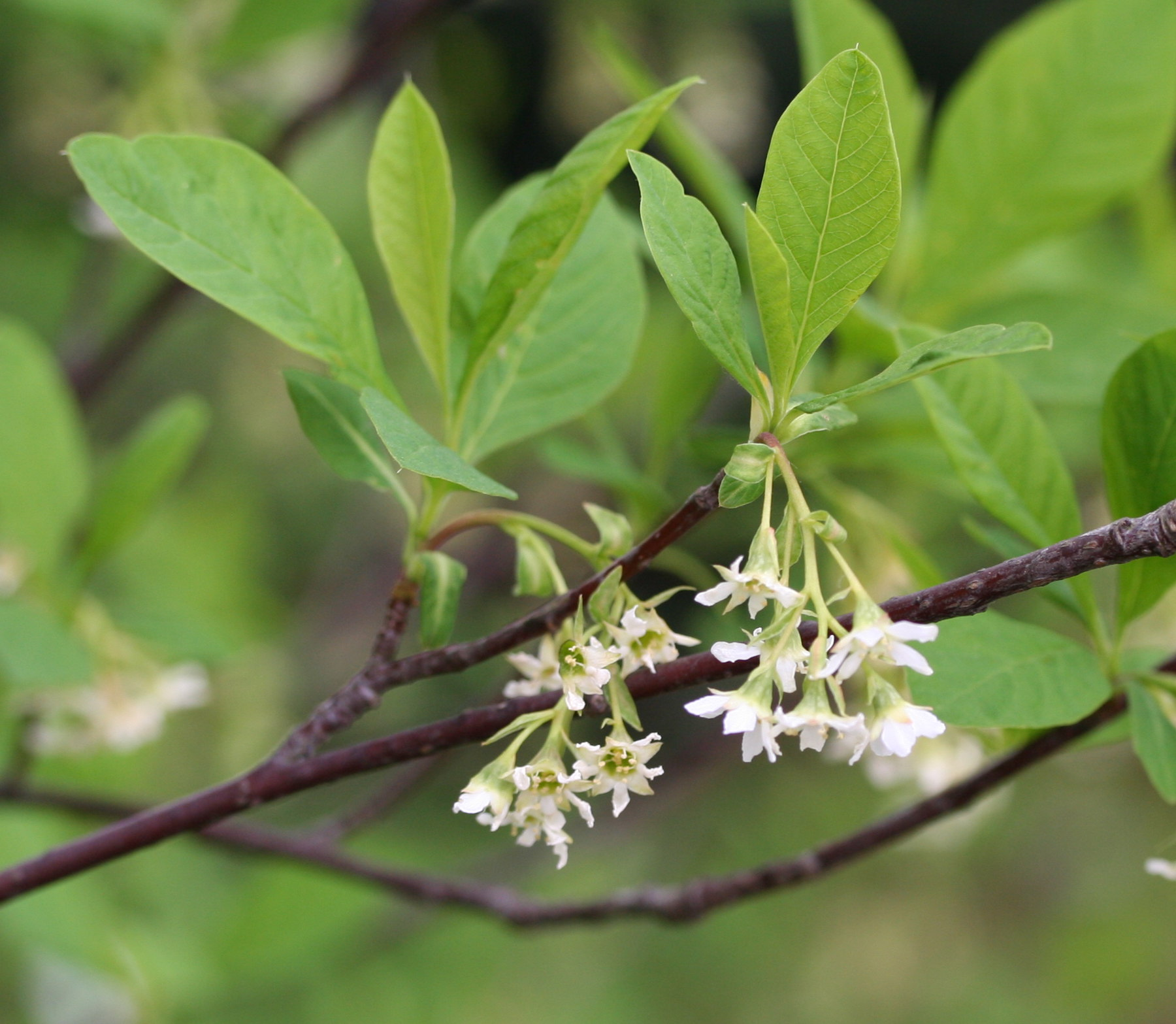
Living Oemleria cerasiformis flowers

The Oemleria janhartfordae fossil was recovered from a single site in the Eocene Okanagan Highlands of Central British Columbia and northeast central Washington state. The single described specimen is from the Klondike Mountain Formation in Northern Ferry County, Washington, being recovered from the "Boot Hill" site B4131 in Republic, Washington.

Early estimates of the highlands sites ranged from Miocene to Eocene in age. The age of the Klondike Mountain Formation was debated for many years, with plant fossils suggesting a Late Oligocene or Early Miocene age, and the first descriptions of species from the area included them in the Middle Miocene Latah Formation. By the early 1960's the Klondike Mountain formation was thought to be late Oligocene in age. Potassium-argon radiometric dating of samples taken near the Tom Thumb mine in 1966 resulted in a tentative 55 million years old age. Further refinement of sample dating has yielded an approximately Early Eocene, Ypresian age, being radiometrically dated as 49.4 million years old. A 2003 report using dating of detrital zircon crystals with the tuffs of the Klondike Mountain Formation had been dated to 49.42 ± 0.54 million years ago, the youngest of the Okanagan Highlands sites, A 2021 report revised the possible oldest age to around 51.2 ± 0.1 million years ago based on isotopic data from zircon crystals.

== History and classification ==
During investigation of fossil Prunus flowers from the Klondike Mountain Formation, paleobotanists John Benedict, Melanie DeVore and Katherine Pigg discovered a fossil with a notably different morphology from the other specimens being studied. Based on examination of the flower Benedict, with DeVore and Pigg, formally described it in a 2011 International Journal of Plant Sciences peer-reviewed article in combination with the cherry relative Prunus cathybrownae. They designated the holotype specimen "SR 08-42-15 A&B" which was from the collections of the Stonerose Interpretive Center in Republic, Washington. The flower was collected by an interpretive center staff member who donated the specimens to Stonerose. Benedict, DeVore, and Pigg coined the species name janhartfordae as a matronym honoring Jan Hartford, a resident of Republic, in recognition of her dedicated collecting at Stonerose and the development of the customized core database essential for the operations of the center, "Stonerose Strata". The customized program tracks fossil specimens, the fossil collector data, and facilitates updates to the collectors on fossils in ongoing research.

O. janhartfordae was used as last common ancestor for the tribe Exochordeae, though Jin et al note they feel the species should not have been included in Oemleria. They do not give specific details as to why they feel this other than that the age of the fossil itself is counter to some molecular dating results. It has also been included in fossil datasets for the dating of the family as a whole.

== Description ==
The single known flower is preserved in postanthesis and, based on the lack of petals and stamen, was starting to develop from flowering stage to fruiting stage. It is born on a 11 mm (7/16 in) long pedicel, that is narrow, 1 mm (1/16 in), and shows the scar from at least on basal bract. The flower has radial symmetry and the upper section of the gynoecium is 6 mm (1/4 in) wide. There are 5 pistils arranged in a circular pattern and fused at the bases. Each overall pistil is approximately 8 mm (5/16 in) tall, with a 5 mm (3/16 in) tall ovary topped by an 3 mm (1/8 in) tall style. The ovaries are enlarged with widths around 3 mm (1/8 in) while the styles are 0.5 mm (0 in) and the capping stigma are 1 mm (1/16 in) wide. The ellipsoid ovaries are asymmetric in profile, with the styles being slightly offset on the ovary tops and curve outwards from the flower center. The stigma has a bilobed shape and are flattened in profile. Around the bottom half of the ovaries is a partially preserved hypanthium.

== Paleoenvironment ==
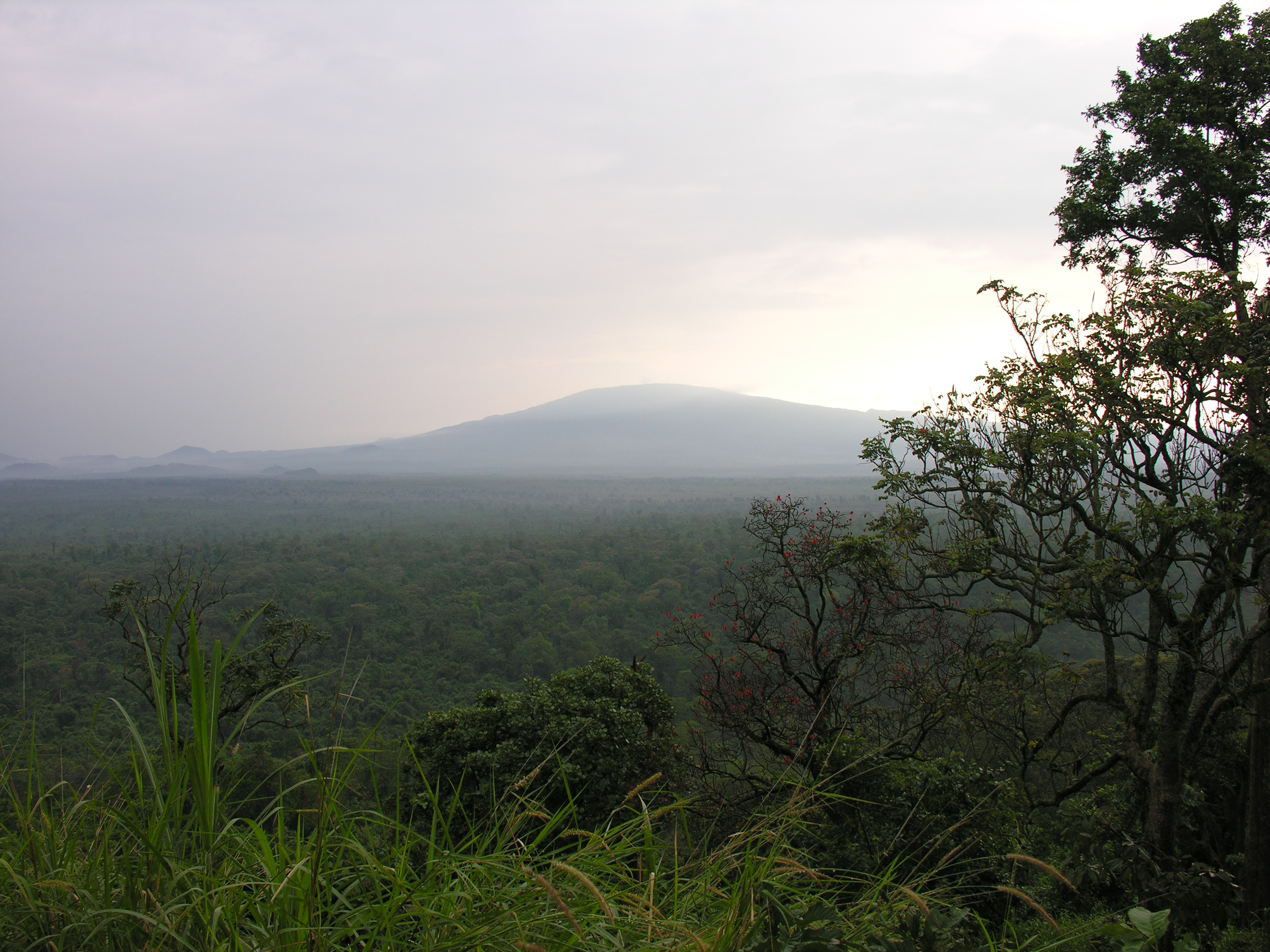
Virunga National Park, Albertine Rift, Africa

The Republic site is part of a larger fossil site system collectively known as the Eocene Okanagan Highlands. The highlands, including the Early Eocene formations between Driftwood Canyon at the north and Republic at the south, have been described as one of the "Great Canadian Lagerstätten" based on the diversity, quality and unique nature of the paleofloral and paleofaunal biotas that are preserved. The highlands temperate biome preserved across a large transect of lakes recorded many of the earliest appearances of modern genera, while also documenting the last stands of ancient lines. The warm temperate highland floras in association with downfaulted lacustrine basins and active volcanism are noted to have no exact modern equivalents. This is due to the more seasonally equitable conditions of the Early Eocene, resulting in much lower seasonal temperature shifts. However, the highlands have been compared to the upland ecological islands of the Virunga Mountains within the African rift valleys Albertine Rift.

The Klondike Mountain Formation represents pinpoint spot a long upland lake system series that was surrounded by a warm temperate ecosystem with nearby volcanism dating from during and just after the early Eocene climatic optimum. The Okanagan Highlands likely had a mesic upper microthermal to lower mesothermal climate, in which winter temperatures rarely dropped low enough for snow, and which were seasonably equitable. The paleoforest surrounding the lakes have been described as precursors to the modern temperate broadleaf and mixed forests of Eastern North America and Eastern Asia. Based on the fossil biotas the lakes were higher and cooler then the coeval coastal forests preserved in the Puget Group and Chuckanut Formation of Western Washington, which are described as lowland tropical forest ecosystems. Estimates of the paleoelevation range between 0.7 and 1.2 km (0.43 and 0.75 mi) higher than the coastal forests. This is consistent with the paleoelevation estimates for the lake systems, which range between 1.1 and 2.9 km (1,100 and 2,900 m), which is similar to the modern elevation 0.8 km (0.50 mi), but higher.

Estimates of the mean annual temperature have been derived from climate leaf analysis multivariate program (CLAMP) analysis and leaf margin analysis (LMA) of the Republic paleoflora. The CLAMP results after multiple linear regressions gave a mean annual temperature of approximately 8.0 °C (46.4 °F), with the LMA giving 9.2 ± 2.0 °C (48.6 ± 3.6 °F). A bioclimatic-based estimate based on modern relatives of the taxa found at Republic suggested mean annual temperatures around 13.5 ± 2.2 °C (56.3 ± 4.0 °F). This is lower than the mean annual temperature estimates given for the coastal Puget Group, which is estimated to have been between 15 and 18.6 °C (59.0 and 65.5 °F). The bioclimatic analysis for Republic suggests a mean annual precipitation amount of 115 ± 39 cm (45 ± 15 in).
