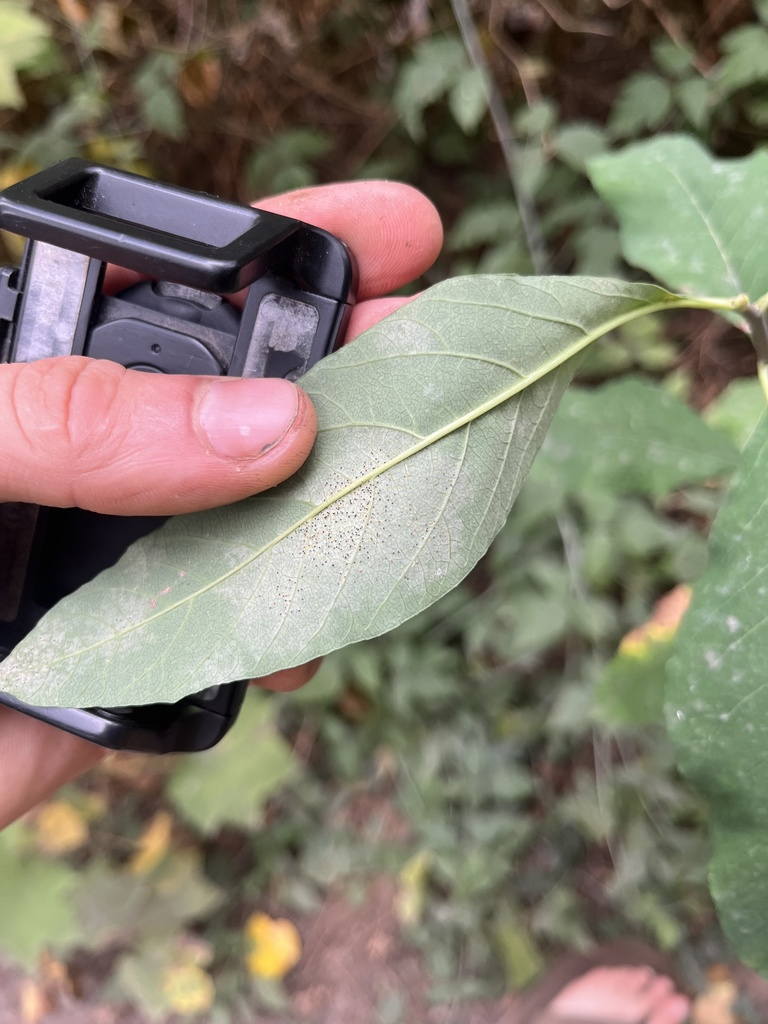

Scientific classification
- Kingdom: Fungi
- Division: Ascomycota
- Class: Leotiomycetes
- Order: Helotiales
- Family: Erysiphaceae
- Genus: Phyllactinia
- Species: P. oemleriae

Binomial name
- Phyllactinia oemleriae M. Bradshaw & J.K. Mitch., 2025

= Phyllactinia oemleriae =

Species of fungus

Phyllactinia oemleriae is a species of powdery mildew in the family Erysiphaceae. It is found in North America, where it affects the genus Oemleria.

== Description ==
The fungus forms a weak, very thin, often smooth coating on the undersides of leaves. P. oemleriae, like most Erysiphaceae, is highly host-specific and infects only the genus Oemleria. It is the only powdery mildew species found on this host.

== Taxonomy ==
The fungus was formally described in 2025 by Michael Bradshaw and James Kameron Mitchell.
