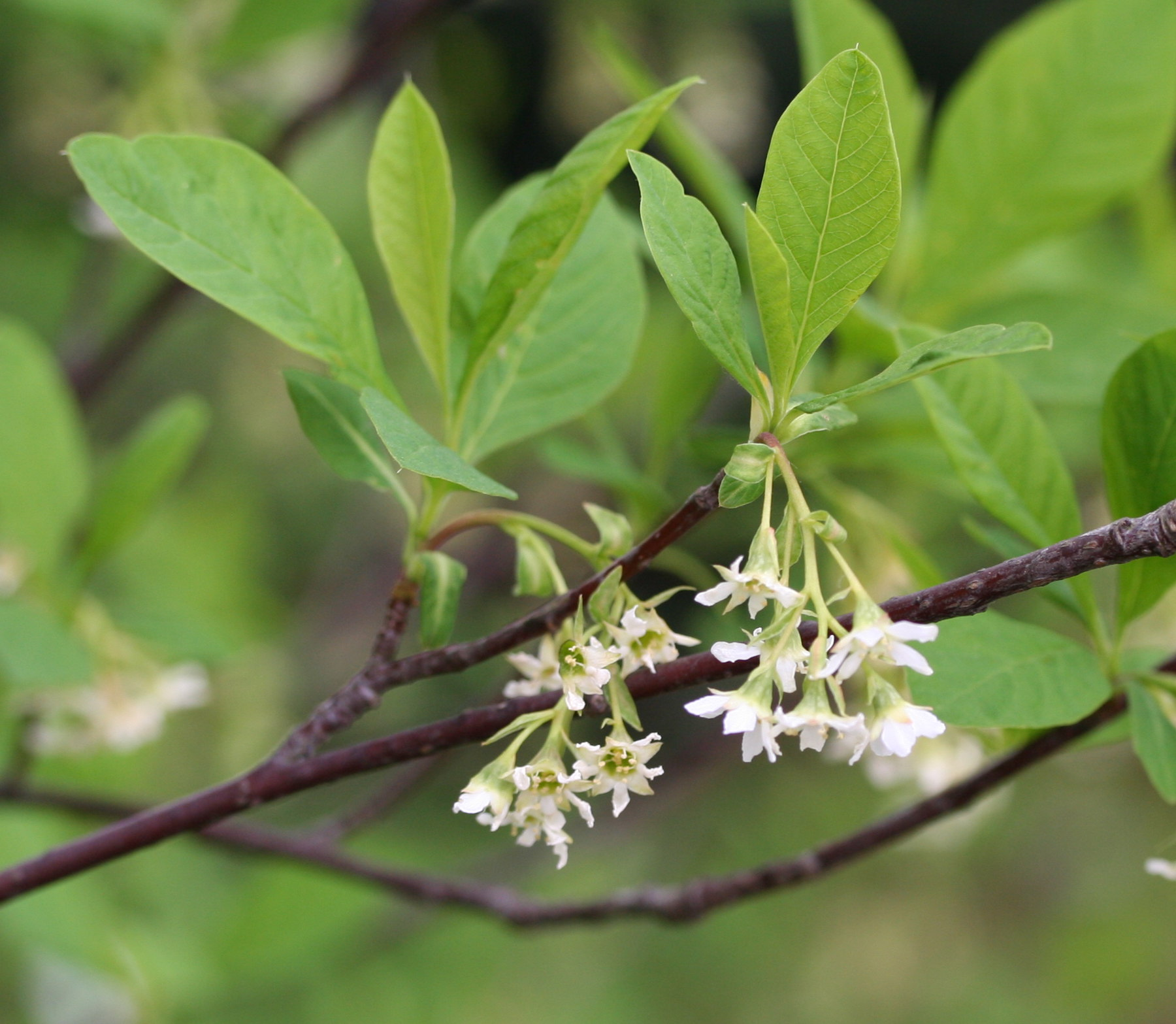

Conservation status
- Least Concern (IUCN 3.1)

- Secure (NatureServe)

Scientific classification
- Kingdom: Plantae
- Clade: Tracheophytes
- Clade: Angiosperms
- Clade: Eudicots
- Clade: Rosids
- Order: Rosales
- Family: Rosaceae
- Genus: Oemleria
- Species: O. cerasiformis

Binomial name
- Oemleria cerasiformis (Torr. & Gray ex Hook. & Arn.) J.W.Landon

Synonyms
- Oemleria synonymy: Nuttallia cerasiformis Torr. & A. Gray ex Hook. & Arn.; Osmaronia cerasiformis (Torr. & A. Gray ex Hook. & Arn.) Greene

= Oemleria cerasiformis =

Oemleria cerasiformis Temporal range: Eocene – recent

Species of flowering plant in the rose family

Oemleria cerasiformis, a shrub commonly known as osoberry, squaw plum, Indian plum, or Indian peach, is the sole extant species in the genus Oemleria. The deciduous and perennial shrub can grow up to 7 meters tall, with spreading branches that produce small white flowers and bitter fruit that only become sweet when fully ripe. Osoberry is dioecious, only female plants producing fruit, while males produce a high reproductive biomass of pollen and flowers. The flowers are insect and hummingbird-pollinated and the fruits are consumed by both birds and mammals, which later disperse the seeds in their droppings (endozoochory).

Fossil records indicate that the species had a similar range during the Eocene epoch. It is native to the Pacific coast and coast ranges of North America, from British Columbia, Canada, to Santa Barbara County, California. Its favored habitat conditions include full sun, moist soil, and low elevation. It is one of the first plants to have its flowers bloom and leaves bud in the late winter.

Native Americans of the West coast tribes have several uses for osoberry, serving purposes such as medicine, food, and tools.

== Description ==
=== Plant structure ===
Osoberry is a deciduous and perennial shrub that can reach an age of 50 years and grow to be 7 meters (23 ft) tall. The branches are spread out and occur in a variety of sizes. The bark is a smooth dark gray to reddish-brown color, with twigs with similar coloring of green to reddish brown. The bright orange lenticels (pores), grow up to 1.3 centimeters (0.5 in) in length on twigs of osoberry. The light green leaves of osoberry are simple, alternating, and oblong, with a length of 5.1–13 cm (2–5 in). These leaves can smell similar to cucumbers.

=== Flowers and fruiting ===
Osoberry bears racemes of small white flowers that have 5 separate pistils, which can develop into a drupe. A drupe can have 10–20 flowers growing from it. The racemes typically grow five to nine flowers, growing from the base of young shoots, and from short shoots of mature twigs. The flowers begin to grow as leaves are emerging and are fully bloomed before leaves have completely emerged. The amount of fruit depends on the amount of light received in the spring, with sunny locations producing more, as well as larger and sweeter fruits. The plum fruit of osoberry begin as reddish pink and deepen to a deep blue color as they ripen. The fruit is known to be bitter, but sweetens as it ripens, tasting similar to cherries or watermelon. The mass of a mature fruit is around 0.2 grams. The osoberry fruit encloses a pit, which contains toxic cyanoglucosides (found also in bitter almonds).

=== Pollination ===
Osoberry are pollinated by native pollinators such as bees, moths, butterflies, hummingbirds, and more. The nectar in the flowers of osoberry is an important source of food for these pollinators in the early spring.

=== Dispersal ===
Osoberry seeds are dispersed through internal animal dispersal. Many animals eat osoberries, primarily birds, along with small mammals, coyotes, foxes, deer, and bear. The seeds are dispersed through the feces of these animals, germinating where they have been defecated.

=== Sex ===
Osoberry is dioecious, with almost all plants being male or female. The shrubs have groups of up to twenty closely spaced stems of the same sex. The plants consist of almost completely strictly one gender, and the individuals are usually male. The reproductive biomass that males are mostly made up of are flowers and petals. On the other hand, the reproductive biomass of female individuals is largely made up of the fruit set. Only female osoberry produce fruit.

== Taxonomy ==
David Douglas and John Scouler were the first botanists to collect Oemleria in 1825, followed by Tolmie, Gairdner, and Nuttall. The genus was first named Nuttallia in 1839, but that name had already been given to three other genera. In 1841, Reichenbach published Oemleria as a nomen novum, in honor of Augustus Gottlieb Oemler, a naturalist in Dresden who had lived in Georgia, had known Nuttall, and had given Reichenbach specimens of plants from America. Reichenbach did not publish a name for the species under the new genus, and most botanists later adopted Osmaronia cerasiformis, published by Edward Lee Greene in 1891, until 1975, when J.W. Landon reasserted the priority of Reichenbach's name and published the full proper name of the species.

=== Fossil record ===
Oemleria cerasiformis is the only extant member of its genus, Oemleria. A fossil species is known from the genus, Oemleria janhartfordae from the Eocene Klondike Mountain Formation. Rosaceous flower fossils found in Northeastern Washington state show that Oemleria was present in the early Eocene of western North America.

== Distribution and habitat ==
O. cerasiformis as its leaves begin to yellow in mid-summer, Pierce County, Washington

Osoberry are found in the Pacific Northwest, ranging from Northern California to Southwestern British Columbia. The shrubs grow in places such as second-growth forests, stream terraces, forest, or roadside margins. Osoberry grow in places with sunlight, and usually below elevations of 300 m (1,000 ft). The shrub can grow up to 1,500 m (5,000 ft) in elevation. Moist soil is preferred, but not grounds that are saturated in winter months.

Osoberry flowers bloom and leaves bud in the late winter to early spring. Osoberry are relatively short compared to trees in the Pacific Northwest. The early bud timing allows the osoberry to get access to sunlight that is not as easily available in later months. When taller trees or shrubs have grown their leaves, this can block sunlight from reaching an osoberry shrub.

== Uses ==
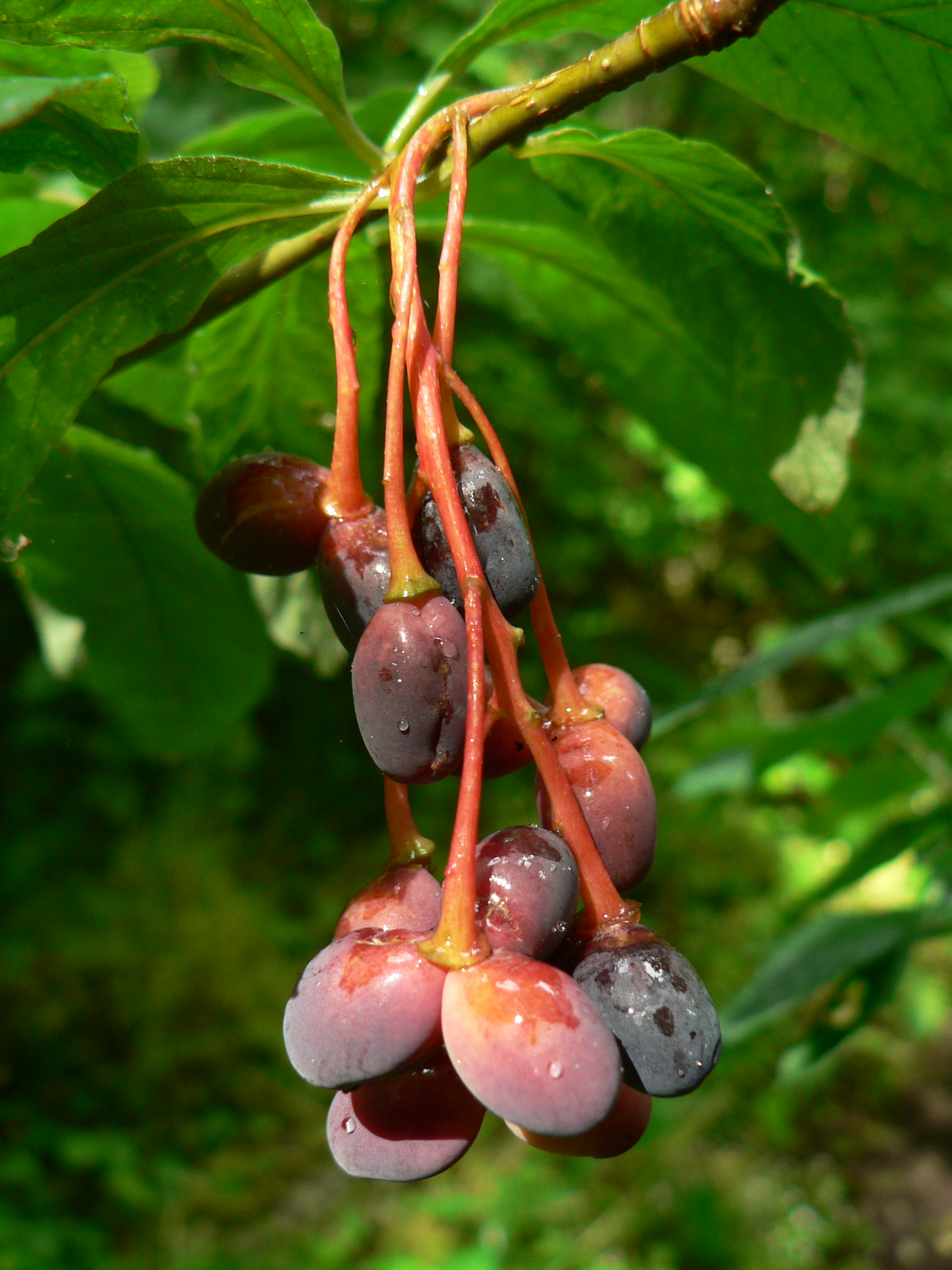
The fruits

The Pacific coast tribes utilized its fruit, twigs, and bark, as food sources and for teas and medicine. It is one of the first tree-borne fruits to ripen in summer and as such was prized by indigenous peoples and wildlife alike.

=== Wood ===
The wood is exceptionally strong and fine-grained. But, with stems generally less than 5 cm (2 in) in diameter, this small size limits the size of products that can be made from it. The fairly common straight shoots make fine primitive arrows and the rare straight stem large enough can be fashioned into an excellent self bow. It is also suitable for small wooden tools such as spoons, combs, knitting needles, etc. The fine grain and lack of significant figure also make the wood well-suited for fine detail carving.

Native Americans made use of the shrub's bark, using it to bind harpoon tips. Native tribes also used the bark of osoberry for treating tuberculosis. The bark was also used as a mild laxative, and chewing its twigs had mild anesthetic and aphrodisiac effects.

Currently, osoberry is popular for restoration projects in the Pacific Northwest. Living osoberry branches can be used as live stakes in restoration projects to prevent erosion. The roots of osoberry are fibrous and are good for preventing erosion of soil.

=== Fruit ===
The fruits can be eaten raw or cooked when bitter; they tend to be somewhat astringent. The Indigenous peoples of the Americas included osoberry in their diets, making tea of the bark. Several Indigenous tribes from Western Washington, such as the Snohomish, Chehalis, and Squaxin tribes, ate the berries fresh. The Cowlitz tribe also ate the berries fresh, along with drying them for winter uses.
