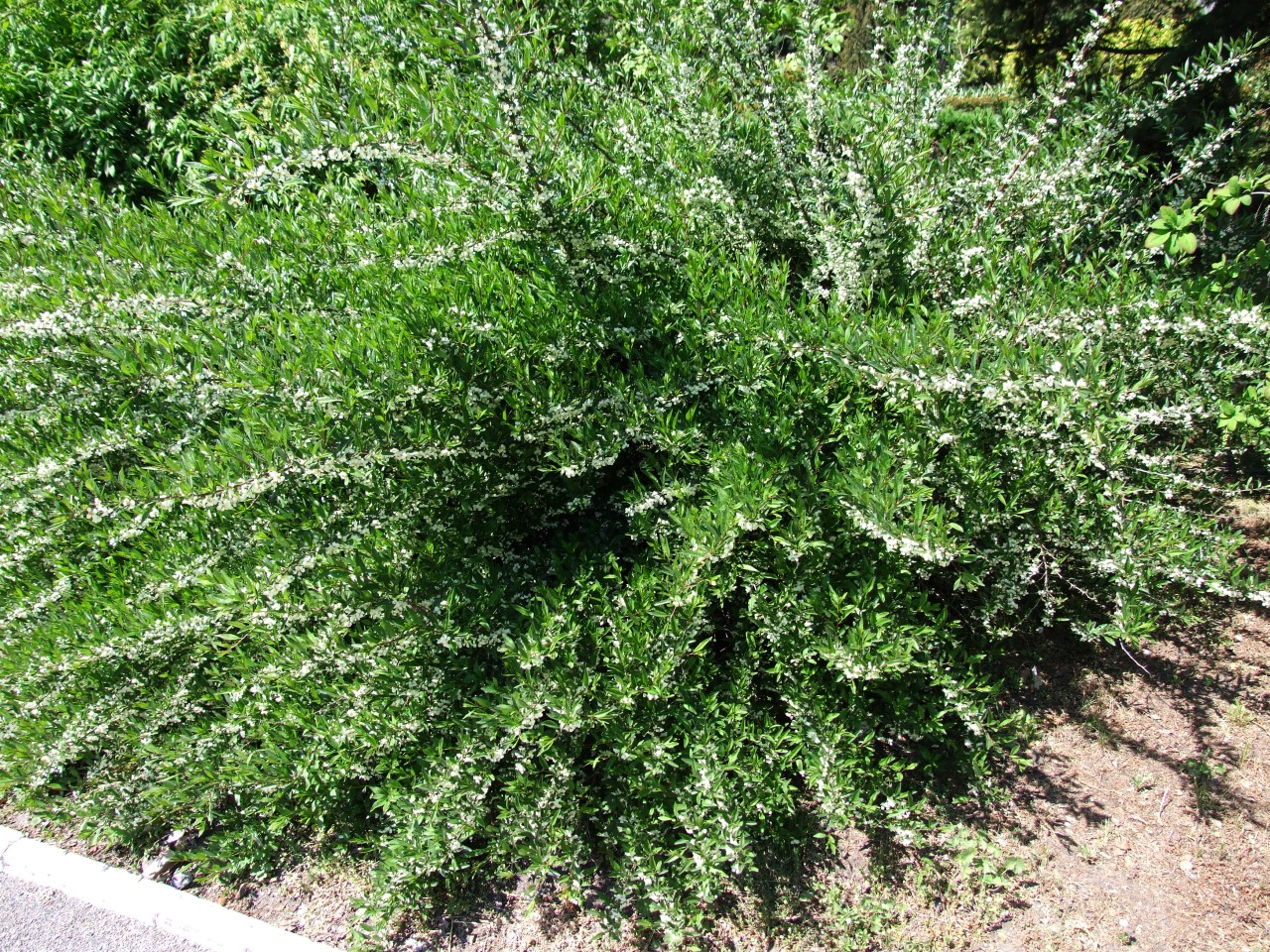
- Prinsepia uniflora

Scientific classification
- Kingdom: Plantae
- Clade: Tracheophytes
- Clade: Angiosperms
- Clade: Eudicots
- Clade: Rosids
- Order: Rosales
- Family: Rosaceae
- Subfamily: Amygdaloideae
- Tribe: Exochordeae
- Genus: Prinsepia; Royle

Species
- Prinsepia sinensis Oliv. ex Bean; Prinsepia uniflora Batalin; Prinsepia utilis Royle

= Prinsepia =

Genus of trees

Prinsepia is a genus of trees in the Rosaceae. It bears fruit which looks like a cherry. The various species grow largely in Nepal, India, China, Bangladesh, and Taiwan, though P. sinensis is hardy in zone 4, to about −32 °C (−26 °F).

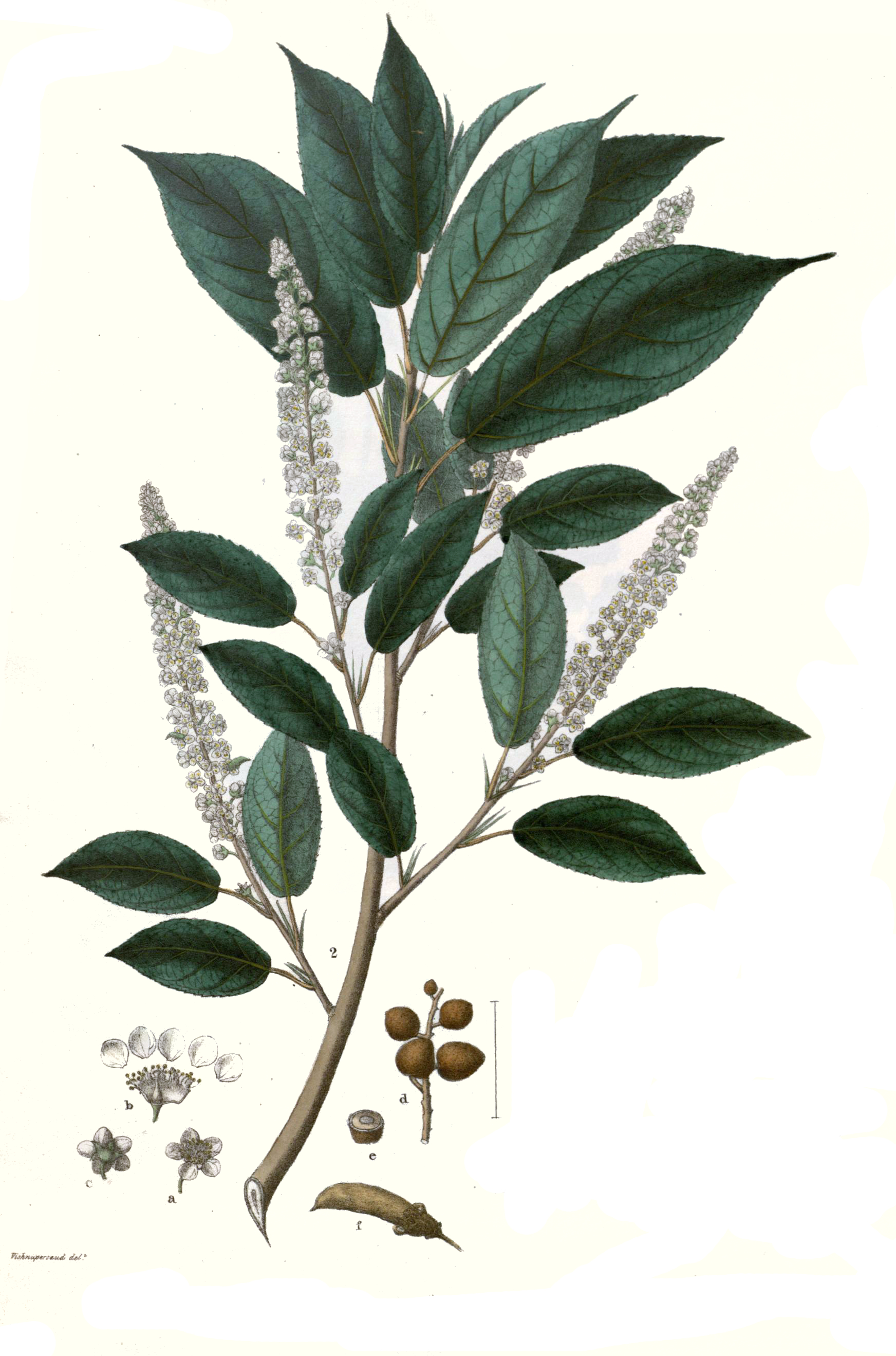
Prinsepia utilis

The plant is named for James Prinsep, scholar, antiquarian, architect, secretary of the Asiatic Society in Calcutta, India, and member of the well-known Prinsep family of India, an Anglo-Indian family prominent in Indian affairs for several generations.
