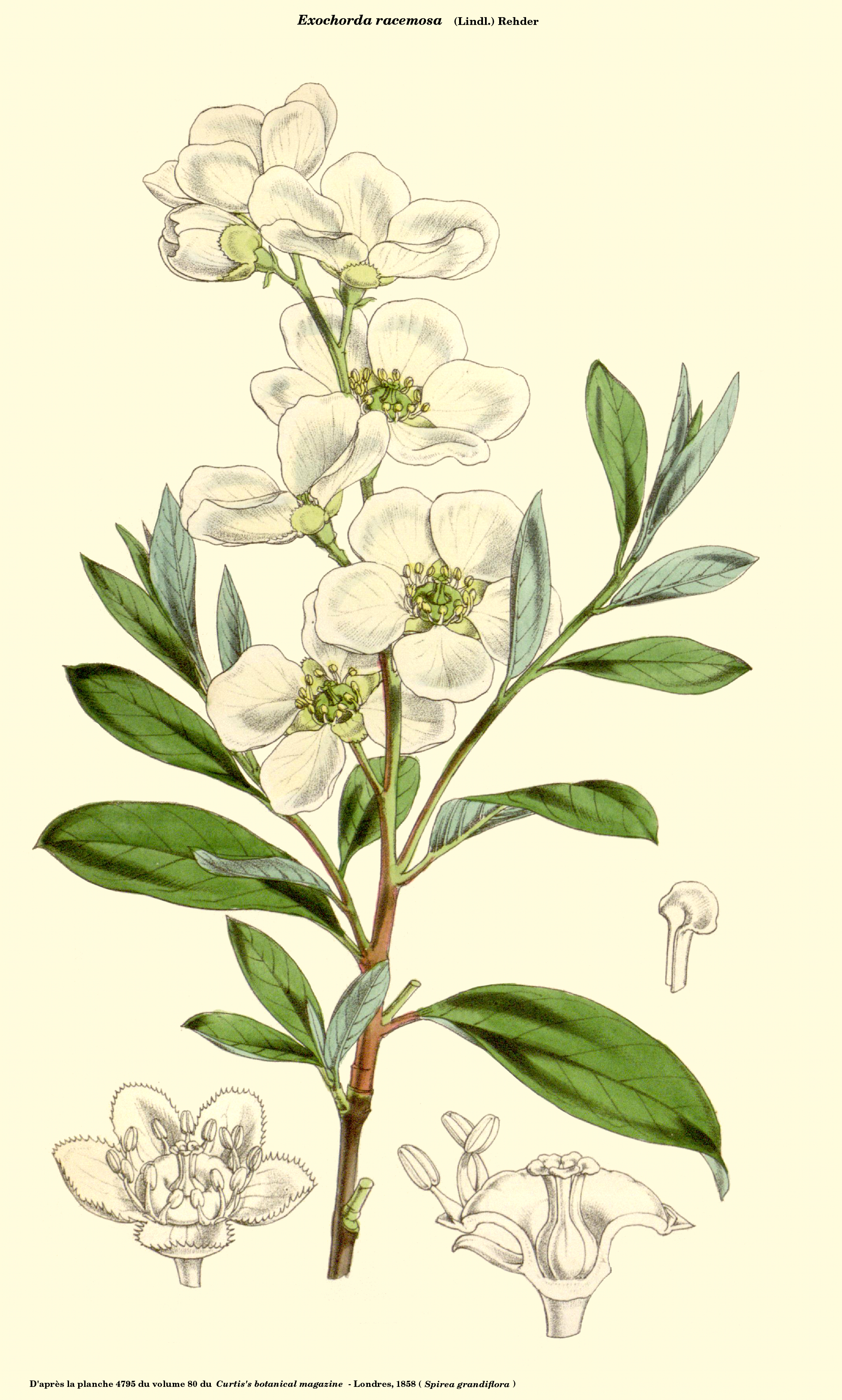
- Exochorda racemosa

Scientific classification
- Kingdom: Plantae
- Clade: Embryophytes
- Clade: Tracheophytes
- Clade: Spermatophytes
- Clade: Angiosperms
- Clade: Eudicots
- Clade: Rosids
- Order: Rosales
- Family: Rosaceae
- Subfamily: Amygdaloideae
- Tribe: Exochordeae

= Exochordeae =

Exochordeae Temporal range: Eocene - recent

Tribe of flowering plants

Exochordeae is a tribe of the rose family, Rosaceae, belonging to the subfamily Amygdaloideae.

== Genera ==
- Exochorda Lindl., China and central Asia.
- Oemleria Rchb., Pacific Coast, North America.
- Prinsepia Royle, Asia
