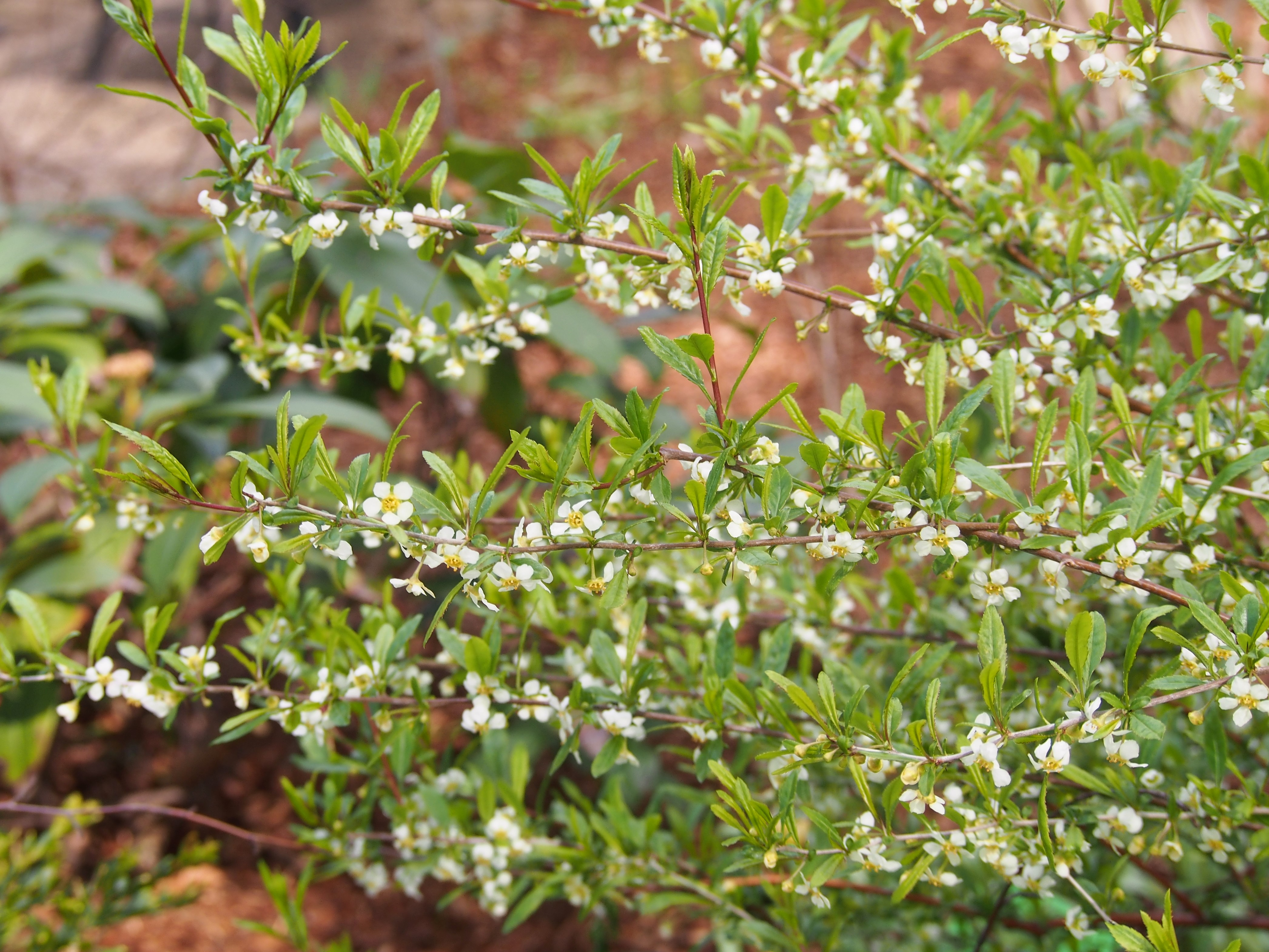
- Flowering branches
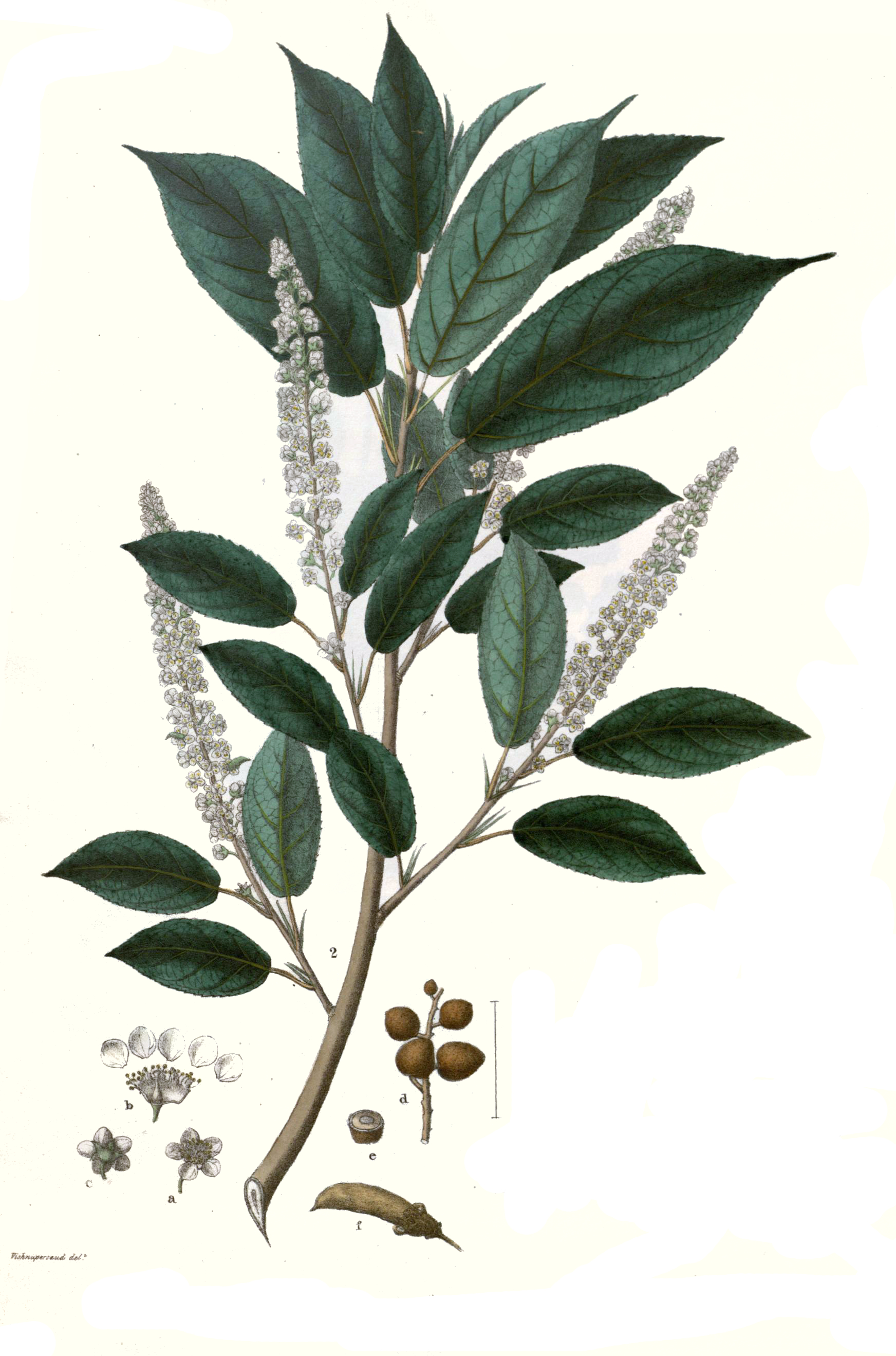
- Botanical illustration

Scientific classification
- Kingdom: Plantae
- Clade: Tracheophytes
- Clade: Angiosperms
- Clade: Eudicots
- Clade: Rosids
- Order: Rosales
- Family: Rosaceae
- Genus: Prinsepia
- Species: P. utilis

Binomial name
- Prinsepia utilis Royle

Synonyms
- Cycnia spinosa Griff.

= Prinsepia utilis =

Species of plant

Prinsepia utilis, the Himalayan wild cherry or Himalayan cherry prinsepia, is a species of flowering plant in the family Rosaceae. It is native to the Himalayan region, from northeast Pakistan to south-central China. In the wild it is typically found at on valley slopes, wastelands, and on trailsides at elevations from 1,000 to 2,600 m (3,300 to 8,500 ft). A spiny shrub from 1 to 5 m (3 to 16 ft) in height, it bears edible fruit which are particularly liked by children, and whose seeds are used to produce a cooking oil. It is also planted as a hedge.

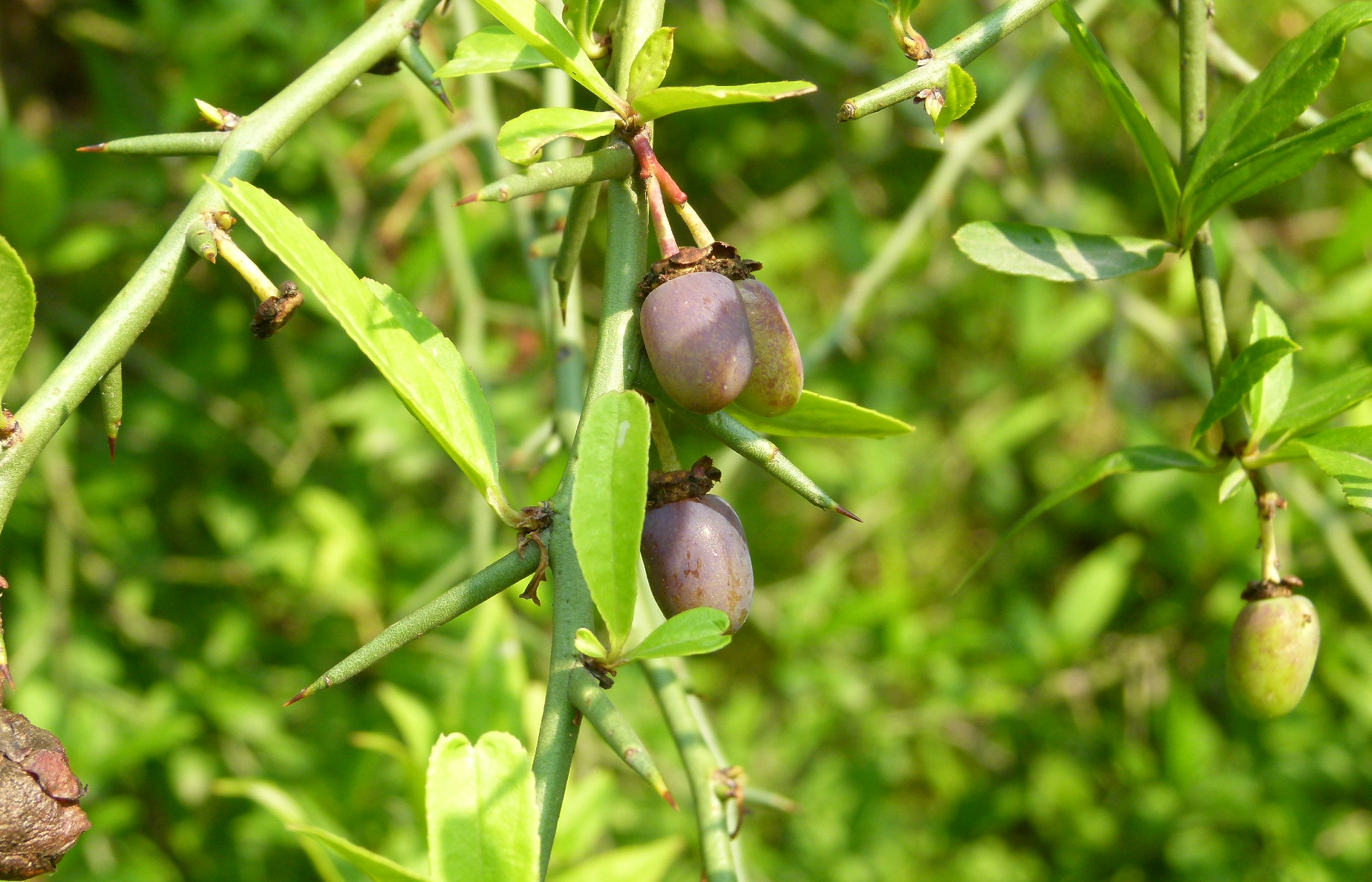
Fruit

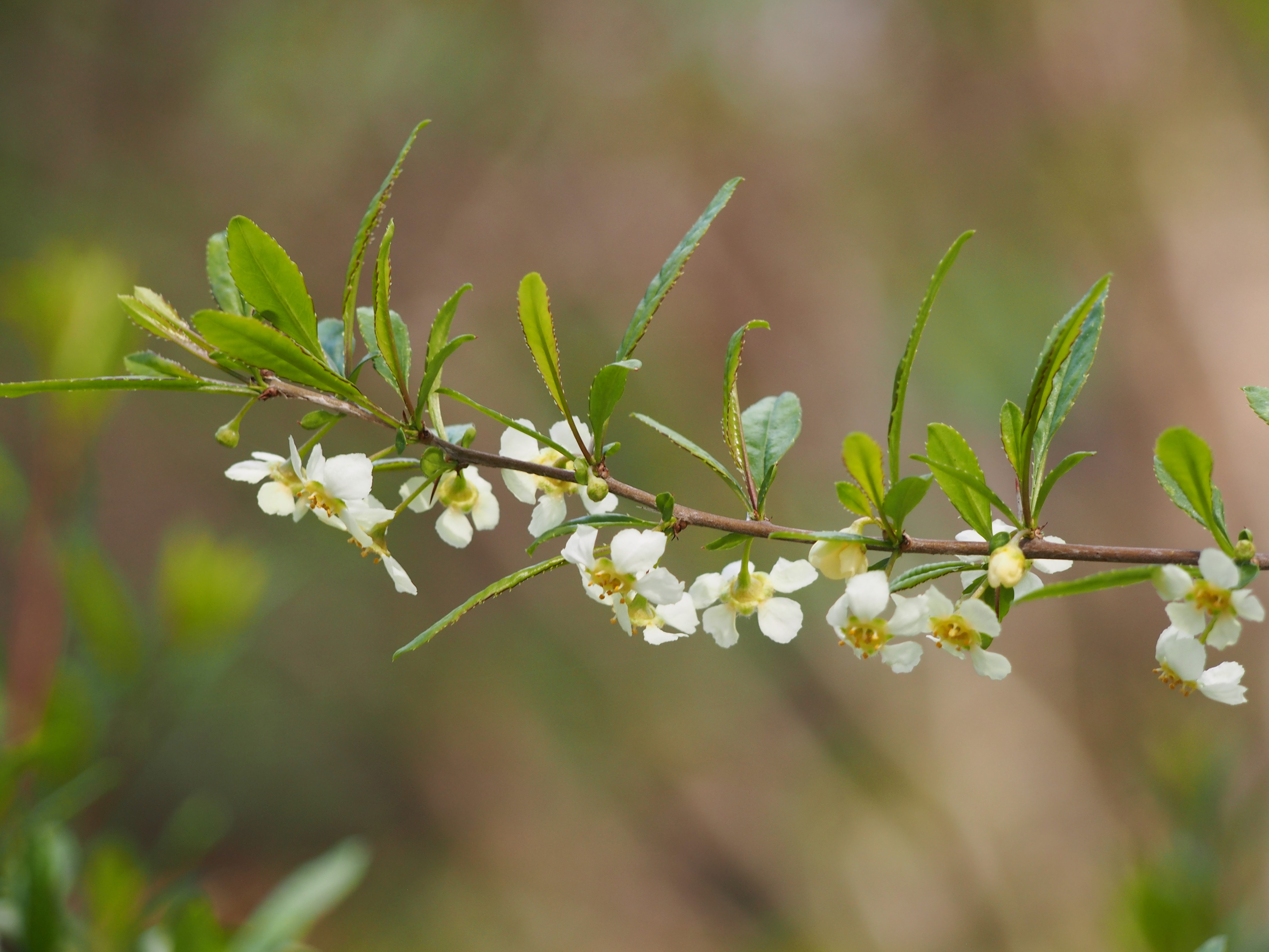
Close-up of flowers

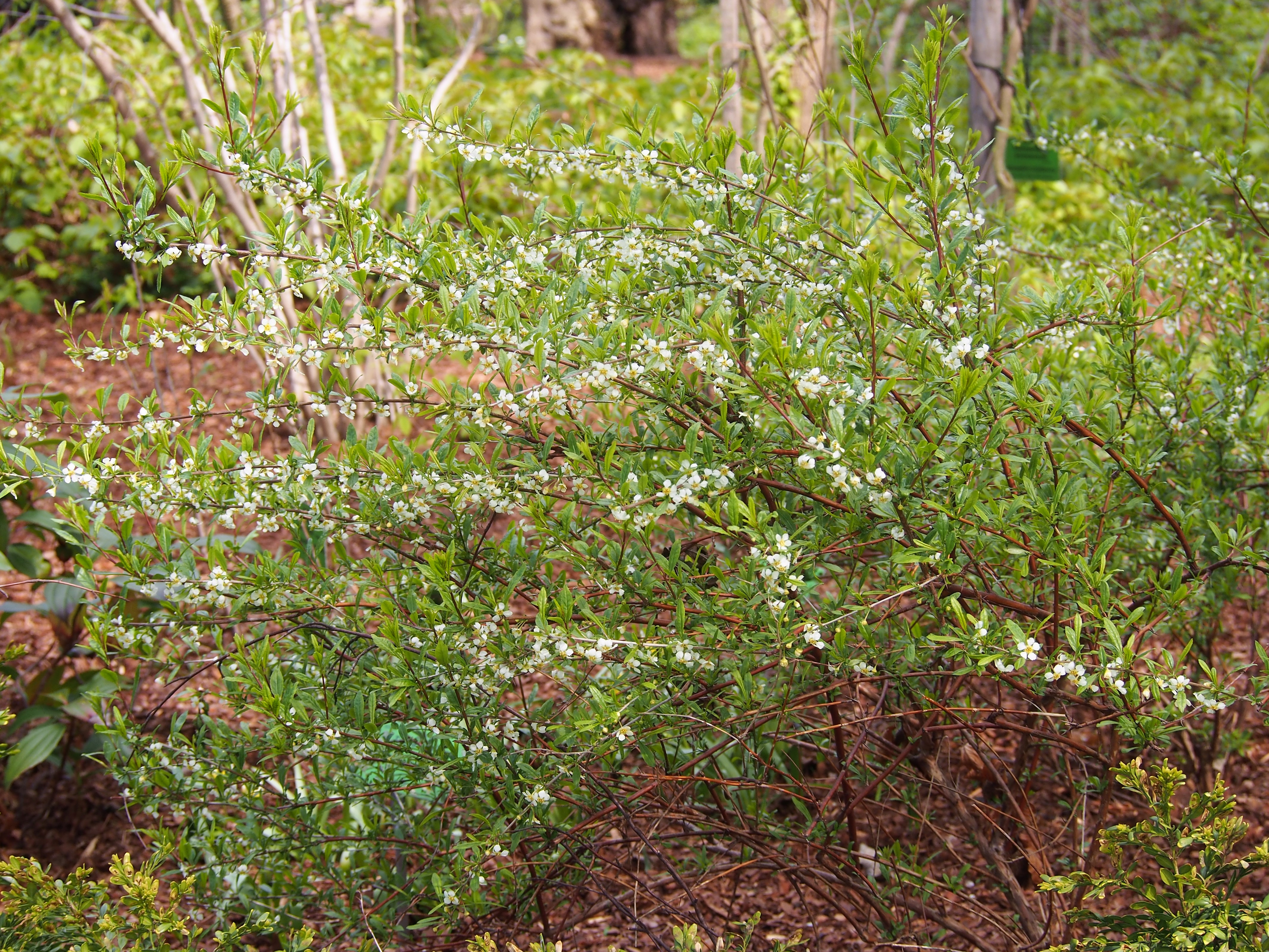
Habit
