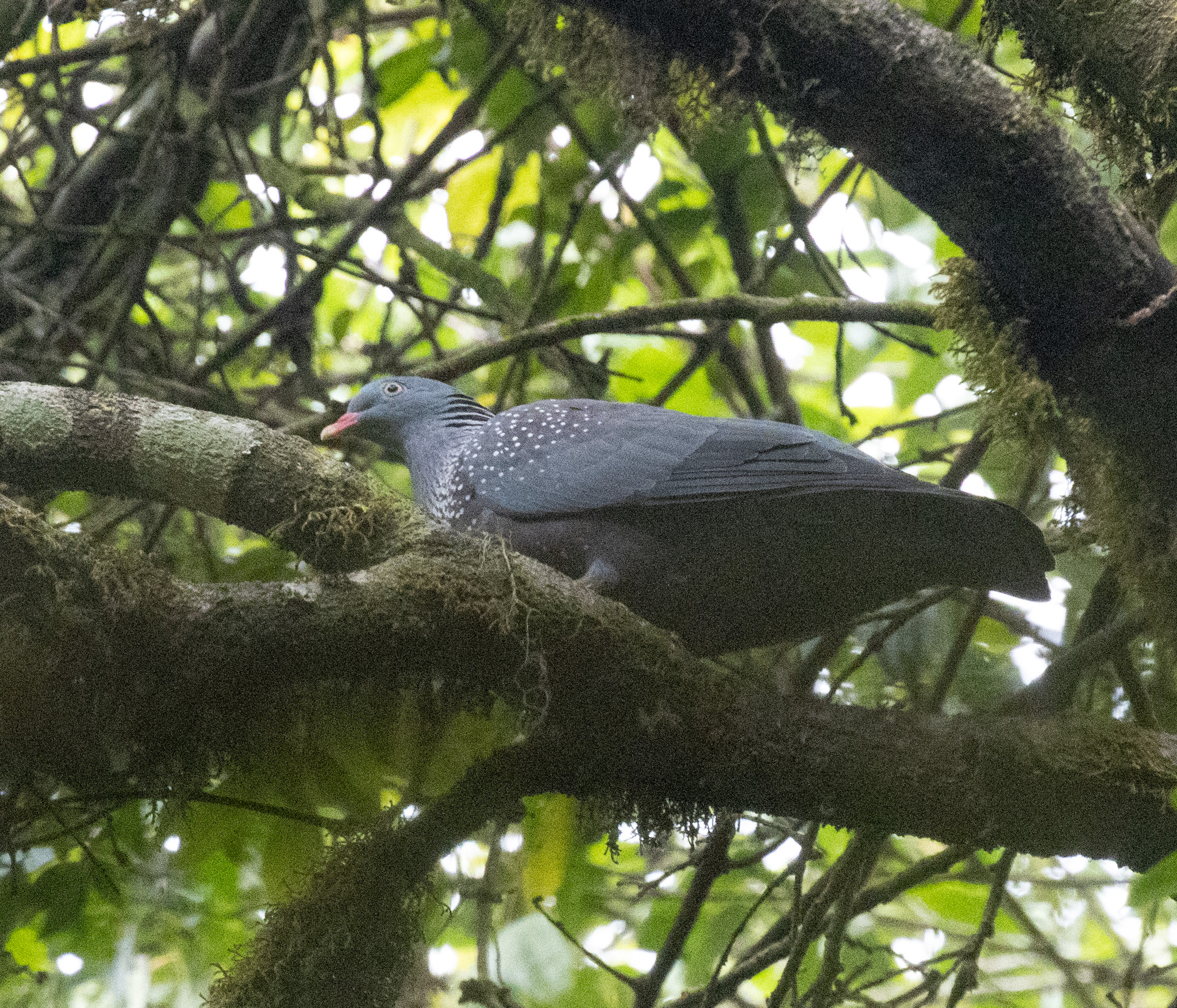

Conservation status
- Least Concern (IUCN 3.1)

Scientific classification
- Kingdom: Animalia
- Phylum: Chordata
- Class: Aves
- Order: Columbiformes
- Family: Columbidae
- Genus: Columba
- Species: C. sjostedti

Binomial name
- Columba sjostedti Reichenow, 1901

= Cameroon olive pigeon =

Species of bird

The Cameroon olive pigeon (Columba sjostedti) is a species of bird in the family Columbidae. It is found in the Cameroon line (including Bioko), and is found in pasture habitats with minimal vegetation cover as well as in montane forests. Its diet includes fruit from Polyscias fulva and waterberry trees.
