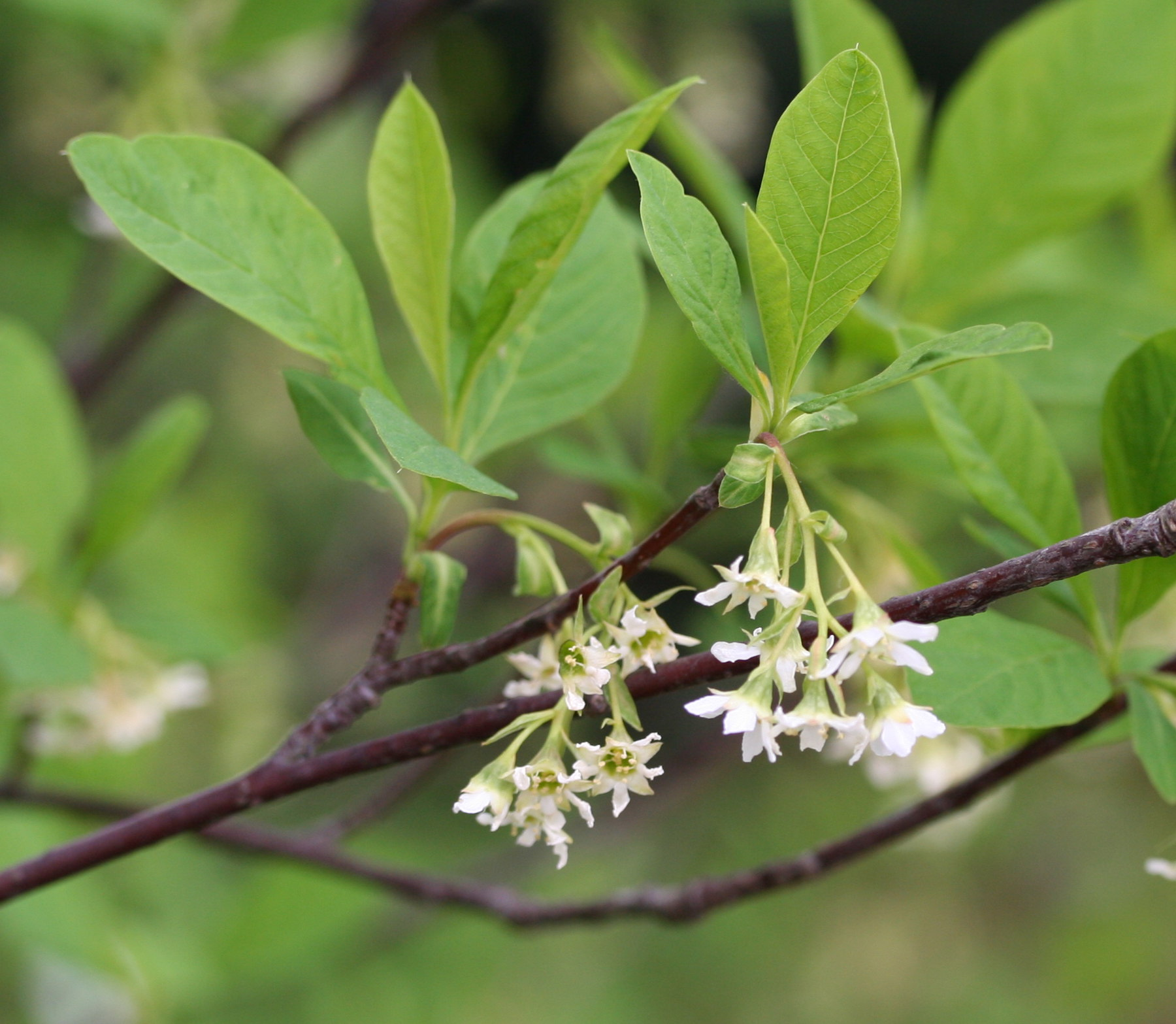
- Oemleria cerasiformis

Scientific classification
- Kingdom: Plantae
- Clade: Tracheophytes
- Clade: Angiosperms
- Clade: Eudicots
- Clade: Rosids
- Order: Rosales
- Family: Rosaceae
- Subfamily: Amygdaloideae
- Tribe: Exochordeae
- Genus: Oemleria; Reichenb.

Species
- Oemleria cerasiformis; †Oemleria janhartfordae

Synonyms
- Nuttallia Torr. & A.Gray ex Hook. & Arn.; Osmaronia Greene

= Oemleria =

Oemleria Temporal range: Eocene - recent

Genus of flowering plant in Rosaceae

Oemleria is a small genus in the rose family native to the Pacific coast areas of North America. It includes one living species, Oemleria cerasiformis and one species described from Washington state fossils, Oemleria janhartfordae.

Oemleria forms the monophyletic tribe Exochordeae with the genera Exchorda and Prinsepia, which is placed in the subfamily Amygdaloideae.
